= List of diarists =

This is an international list of diarists who have Wikipedia pages and whose journals have been published.

== A ==
- Layal Abboud (born 1982), Lebanese singer and dancer
- Rreze Abdullahu (born 1990), Kosovo Albanian writer
- Abutsu-ni (阿仏尼, c. 1222–1283), Japanese nun and poet
- J. R. Ackerley (1896–1967), English literary editor and biographer
- Louise-Victorine Ackermann (1813–1890), French writer and philosopher
- Lady Harriet Acland (1750–1815), English noblewoman and nurse
- John Adams (1735–1826), 2nd President of the United States, statesman and diplomat
- John Quincy Adams (1767–1848), 6th President of the United States, statesman and diplomat
- Catherine Adamson (1868–1925), New Zealand homemaker
- Felix Aderca (1891–1962), Romanian novelist, playwright and poet
- James Agate (1877–1947), English writer and critic
- Louisa May Alcott (1832–1888), American novelist
- William Allingham (1824–1889), Irish poet
- Nuha al-Radi (1941–2004), Iraqi potter and painter
- Thura al-Windawi (born 1983), Iraqi pharmacologist and political commentator
- Isaac Ambrose (1604–1664), English Puritan
- Henri-Frédéric Amiel (1821–1881), Swiss philosopher, poet and critic
- Hansine Andræ (1817–1898), Danish feminist
- Guillaume Apollinaire (1880–1918), French writer
- Guillaume Applebaum (born 1930), Polish Jewish Holocaust survivor
- Harriet Arbuthnot (1793–1834), English associate of Arthur Wellesley, 1st Duke of Wellington
- Takeo Arishima (有島 武郎, 1878–1923), Japanese novelist
- Antonin Artaud (1896–1948), French writer and critic
- Lady Cynthia Asquith (1887–1960), English writer
- Elise Aubert (1837–1909), Norwegian fiction and non-fiction writer
- Charles John Ayton (1846–1922), New Zealand gold miner and rabbiter

== B ==
- Gustav Badin (1747 or 1750–1822), Swedish court servant
- Elizabeth Baker (c. 1720 – c. 1797), English secretary and geologist
- David Paton Balfour (1841–1894), New Zealand sheep farmer and roading supervisor
- Martha Ballard (1735–1812), American midwife and healer
- Samuel Bamford (1788–1872), English dialect poet and dialect theorist
- Maria Banuș (1914–1999), Romanian poet and essayist
- Sara Banzet (1745–1774), French educator
- Aurel Baranga (1913–1979), Romanian playwright and poet
- W. N. P. Barbellion (1889–1919), English naturalist, essayist and short story writer
- Mary Anne Barker (1831–1911), Jamaican-born Australian writer
- Archie Barwick (1890–1966), Australian farmer and soldier
- Vaikom Muhammad Basheer (1908–1994), Indian independence activist and writer
- Franta Bass (1930-1944), Jewish Czech child poet, Holocaust victim
- Marie Bashkirtseff (1858–1884), Ukrainian painter and sculptor (in French)
- Fred Bason (1907–1973), English bookseller, broadcaster and writer
- Annie Maria Baxter (1816–1905), English-born Australian housewife
- Peter Hill Beard (born 1938), American photographer in Africa
- Cecil Beaton (1904–1980), English fashion, portrait and war photographer
- Simone de Beauvoir (1908–1986), French writer and philosopher
- Ben no Naishi (弁内侍, c. 1220s – c. 1270), Japanese court lady and poet
- Ruth Benedict (1887–1948), American anthropologist
- Tony Benn (Anthony Wedgwood Benn, 1925–2014), English politician
- Alan Bennett (born 1934), English writer and playwright
- Arnold Bennett (1867–1931), English novelist
- A. C. Benson (1862–1925), English academic, biographer and poet
- Märta Berendes (1639–1717), Swedish mistress of the robes
- Mary Berg (1924–2013), Polish Jewish Holocaust survivor from the Warsaw Ghetto
- Olga Bergholz (1910–1975), Soviet poet and playwright
- Pierre Bergounioux (born 1949), French writer
- Hélène Berr (1921–1945), French writer on Nazi occupation of Paris
- Bertolt Brecht (1898–1956), German playwright, poet and politician
- Alfred Bestall (1892–1986), English illustrator, best known for Rupert Bear stories
- Mary Matilda Betham (1776–1852), English poet, woman of letters and miniature portrait painter.
- Ethel Bilbrough (1868–1951), English First World War diarist and artist
- Maine de Biran (1766–1824), French writer, philosopher and mathematician
- Léon Bloy (1846–1917), French novelist, poet and pamphleteer
- Nicholas Blundell (1669–1737), English squire
- Wilfrid Scawen Blunt (1840–1922), English poet and writer
- Barbara Bodichon (1827–1891), English educationalist, feminist and traveller (An American Diary 1857–1858)
- George Wallace Bollinger (1890–1917), New Zealand soldier
- Violet Bonham Carter (1887–1969), English politician, daughter of Prime Minister H. H. Asquith
- Teresina Bontempi (1883–1968) Swiss political activist
- Stanley Booth (1942–2024), American music journalist
- Józef Boruwłaski (1739–1837), Polish dwarf musician
- James Boswell (1740–1795), Scottish chronicler of Samuel Johnson
- Jimmy Boyle (born 1944), Scottish gangster, sculptor and novelist
- Jocelyn de Brakelond (c. 1155 – c. 1202), English monk (in Latin)
- Ulrich Bräker (1735–1798), Swiss autodidact and writer
- Gyles Brandreth (born 1948), English writer and politician
- Alice Dayrell Caldeira Brant (1880–1970), Brazilian teenage diarist
- Patrick Breen (1795–1868), American member of The Donner Party, who suffered while stranded in the wilderness in the winter of 1846/47
- Arthur Bremer (born 1950), American attempted assassin of George Wallace
- Sir William Brereton, 1st Baronet (1604–1661), English politician and Roundhead military commander
- Vera Brittain (1893–1970), English author and feminist
- Benjamin Britten (1913–1976), English composer
- Ford Madox Brown (1821–1893), French-born English painter
- David Bruce (1898–1977), American ambassador
- Nathaniel Bryceson (1826–1911), English clerk
- Thomas Bryn (1782–1827), Norwegian jurist and civil servant
- Emanoil Bucuța (1887–1946), Romanian novelist, critic and poet
- Kazimierz Bujnicki (1788–1878), Polish writer
- Deborah Bull (born 1963), English ballet dancer and writer
- Reader Bullard (1885–1976), English diplomat
- Ivan Bunin (1870–1953), Russian/Soviet novelist
- Fanny Burney (1752–1840), English novelist, playwright and biographer
- Richard Burton (1925–1984), Welsh actor
- Elizabeth Bury (1644–1720), English nonconformist
- Eleanor Charlotte Butler (1739–1829) One of the once controversial Ladies of Llangollen
- Mary Butts (1890–1937), English writer
- William Byrd II (1674–1744), Colonial American diarist
- Lord Byron (1788–1824), English poet and traveler

== C ==
- Meg Cabot (born 1967), American YA author
- Alexander Cadogan (1884–1968), English diplomat and civil servant
- Louis Calaferte (1928–1994), French novelist and essayist
- Matei Călinescu (1934–2009), Romanian critic and professor
- Alastair Campbell (born 1957), Anglo-Scottish journalist, broadcaster and author
- Thomas Campbell (1733–1795), Irish Protestant minister and travel writer
- Zenobia Camprubí (1887–1956), Spanish Civil War seen from Cuba
- Albert Camus (1913–1960), Algerian-born French writer and philosopher
- Emily Carr (1871–1945), Canadian artist
- Dora Carrington (1893–1932), English painter
- Jim Carroll (1949–2009), American author, poet and musician
- Lewis Carroll (Charles L. Dodgson, 1832–1898), English writer and mathematician
- Adolfo Bioy Casares (1914–1999), Argentine fiction writer and collaborator with Jorge Luis Borges
- Richard Casey, Baron Casey (1890–1976), Australian statesman and ambassador
- Judy Cassab (1920–2015), Australian artist
- Constance de Castelbajac (1859–1886), French aristocrat
- Abelardo Castillo (1935–2017), Argentine novelist and essayist
- Barbara Castle (1910–2002), English politician
- Henri de Catt (1725–1795), Swiss scholar
- Catherine Caughey (1923–2008), Kenyan-born New Zealand code breaker and occupational therapist
- Hannah Rebecca Frances Caverhill (1834–1897), New Zealand homemaker
- Henry "Chips" Channon (1897–1958), Anglo-American politician and author
- Miriam Chaszczewacki (1924–1942), Polish Jewish Holocaust victim
- John Cheever (1912–1982), American novelist
- Claire Lee Chennault (1890–1958), American World War II General, head of the Flying Tigers
- Mary Boykin Chesnut (1823–1886), American who described life in South Carolina in the American Civil War
- Choe Bu (최부, 1454–1504), Korean official and traveler
- Johan Koren Christie (1909–1995), Norwegian air-force major general
- Galeazzo Ciano (1903–1944), Mussolini's Italian foreign minister
- Hanns Cibulka (1920–2004), German Bohemian poet
- Emil Cioran (1911–1995), Romanian writer and philosopher
- Alan Clark (1928–1999), English politician and historian
- Andrew Clark (1856–1922), Scottish diarist and cleric
- Ossie Clark (1942–1996), English fashion designer
- Ralph Clark (1755 or 1762 – 1794), Scottish naval officer
- Willem de Clercq (1795–1844), Dutch Protestant revivalist
- Lady Anne Clifford (1590–1676), English literary patron and correspondent
- Kurt Cobain (1967–1994), American rock musician, Nirvana's lead singer
- Henry Cockburn, Lord Cockburn (1779–1854), Scottish judge and writer
- Richard Cocks (1566–1624), English head of trading post in Japan
- Jean Cocteau (1889–1963), French writer and filmmaker
- John Alan Coey (1950–1975), American soldier with the Rhodesian army
- Willy Cohn (1888–1941), German Jewish historian and teacher
- Mary Coke (1727–1811), English diarist and correspondent
- William Cole (1714–1782), English Anglican cleric and antiquary
- Maurice Collis (1889–1973), Irish administrator in Burma and writer
- Christopher Columbus (Cristoforo Colombo, c. 1451 – 1506), Italian explorer and colonizer
- Jock Colville (1915–1987), English civil servant
- Jemima Condict (1754–1779), American child diarist
- Yves Congar (1904–1995), French Dominican friar and theologian
- Thomas Coningsby (9 October 1550-30 May 1625), English soldier and member of parliament
- Benjamin Constant (1767–1830), French writer, philosopher and politician
- Ethel Cooper (1871–1961), Australian musician and First World War German detainee
- Eleanor Coppola (1936–2024), American filmmaker and writer
- Rachel Corrie (1979–2003), American activist
- William Johnson Cory (1823–1892), English schoolmaster and scholar
- Celso Benigno Luigi Costantini (1876–1958), Vatican cardinal and Apostolic Chancellor
- Noël Coward (1899–1973), English playwright and composer
- Mary Cowper (1685–1724), English courtier
- James Cox (1846–1925), New Zealand swagman
- Peter Julius Coyet (1618–1667), Swedish envoy to England
- Thomas Creevey (1768–1838), English politician
- Nicholas Cresswell (1750–1804), English settler in the American colonies
- Nicolae Cristea (1834–1902), Romanian priest and political activist
- John Wilson Croker (1780–1857), Irish-born politician
- Susan Mary Crompton (1846–1932), Australian social welfare reformer
- Fritz Cronman (c. 1640 – c. 1680), Swedish diplomat
- Richard Crossman (1907–1974), English politician and writer
- Aleister Crowley (1875–1947), English occultist and poet
- Hannah Cullwick (1833–1909), English domestic servant and lodging-house keeper
- Marie Curie (1867–1934), Polish physicist and chemist
- Alexis Curvers (1906–1992), Belgian writer
- Cyryl Czarkowski-Golejewski (1885–1940), Polish landowner and Katyn massacre victim
- Klementyna Czartoryska (1780–1852), Polish noblewoman
- Adam Czerniaków (1880–1942), Polish head of the Warsaw Ghetto's Judenrat and Holocaust victim

== D ==
- Ludvig Daae (1829–1893), Norwegian jurist and politician
- Eugène Dabit (1898–1936), French writer
- Maria Dąbrowska (1889–1965), Polish novelist and playwright
- Luísa Dacosta (1927–2015), Portuguese fiction writer and poet
- Thomas Dallam (1570 – post-1614), English organ builder (diary 1598–1599, journey to Turkey)
- Jasper Danckaerts (1639–1702/1704), Dutch North American colonist and travel writer
- Đặng Thùy Trâm (1942–1970), Vietnamese army surgeon
- Jacob Hersleb Darre (1757–1841), Norwegian chaplain and constitutional assembly representative
- Gregorio Dati (1363–1435), Florentine merchant
- Emilie Davis (fl. 1860s), African-American diarist
- Anna Dawbin (1816–1905), English-born Australian housewife and foster mother
- Dorothy Day (1897-1980), American journalist and co-founder of the Catholic Worker Movement
- Jens Peter Debes (1776–1832), Norwegian judge and politician
- John Dee 17th-century English mathematician and astronomer of Welsh extraction
- Sophie Dedekam (1820–1894), Norwegian composer
- Helga Deen (1925–1943), Dutch/German Holocaust victim
- Eugène Delacroix (1798–1863), French painter
- E. M. Delafield (1890–1943), English novelist
- Bernard Delvaille (1931–2006), French poet and anthologist
- Dan Deșliu (1927–1992), Romanian poet
- Giuseppe Dessì (1909–1977), Italian novelist and playwright
- Simonds d'Ewes (1602–1650), English antiquary and politician
- George Diamandy (1867–1917), Romanian politician and social scientist
- Charles Lutwidge Dodgson: see Lewis Carroll
- George Bubb Dodington (1691–1762), English politician and nobleman
- Pete Doherty, English rock musician (Babyshambles), (born 1979), ex-member of The Libertines
- Emil Dorian, Romanian poet and physician
- Anna Dostoyevskaya (1846–1918), Russian wife of Fyodor Dostoevsky
- Fyodor Dostoevsky (1821–1881), Russian novelist
- Gusta Dawidson Draenger (1917–1943), Polish Holocaust victim
- Elizabeth Sandwith Drinker (c. 1735–1807), American Quaker diarist
- Erich Dublon, German-Jewish would-be immigrant to the United States, and Holocaust victim
- Alice Dudeney (1866–1945), English novelist (life in Sussex)
- Eugène Duflot de Mofras (1810–1884), French naturalist and diplomat
- William Dugdale (1605–1686), English antiquary and historian
- Antera Duke (died post-1788), Nigerian slave trader
- Marguerite Duras (1914–1996), French novelist and scriptwriter
- Bob Dylan (born 1941), American musician and songwriter
- William Dyott (1761-1847), British army General and aide-de-camp of George III

== E ==
- Isabelle Eberhardt (1877–1904), Swiss explorer and writer
- Christina Ebner (1277–1356), German Dominican mystic
- Margareta Ebner (1291–1351), German Dominican nun
- Dickon Edwards (born 1971), British musician and dandy
- Jacob Elet (earlier 18th c.), Dutch factor on the Slave Coast of West Africa
- Mircea Eliade (1907–1986), Romanian historian of religion and mythologist
- George Eliot (Mary Anne Evans, 1819–1880), English novelist
- Edward Robb Ellis (1911–1998), American writer and reporter
- Ralph Waldo Emerson (1803–1882), American writer
- Selma Engel-Wijnberg (1922–2018), Dutch Holocaust survivor
- Brian Eno (born 1948), English musician, record producer and polymath
- Annie Ernaux (1940-), French writer
- John Evelyn (1620–1706), English writer, scholar and gardener

== F ==
- Marianne Faithfull (born 1946), English singer and actress
- Joseph Farington (1747–1821), English landscape painter
- Florence Farmborough (1887–1978), English nurse and author
- John Pascoe Fawkner (1792–1869), Australian pioneer and politician
- Eliza Fay (1756–1816), English traveller to India
- Miksa Fenyő (1877–1972), Hungarian politician and poet
- Jacques Fesch (1930–1957), French murderer and Catholic convert
- Dorothea de Ficquelmont (1804–1863), Russian diarist in French and salonnière
- Celia Fiennes (1652–1741), English traveler
- Zlata Filipović (born 1980), Bosnian child and adult diarist in Sarajevo
- Carrie Fisher (1956–2016), American actress and writer
- F. Scott Fitzgerald (1896–1940), American writer
- Arne Fjellbu (1890–1962), Norwegian bishop
- Marjorie Fleming (1803–1811), Scottish child diarist (diary 1809–1811)
- Margaret Fountaine (1862–1940), lepidopterist
- Caroline Fox (1819–1871), English socialite, sister of Barclay
- George Fox (1624–1691), English founder of the Quakers
- Samuel Foxe (1560–1630), English politician
- Anne Frank (1929–1945), Dutch Holocaust victim, documenting her life in hiding (1941–1945)
- Miles Franklin (1879–1954), Australian author
- Elizabeth Wynne Fremantle (1789–1857), English wife of Thomas Fremantle (Royal Navy officer), main contributor to The Wynne Diaries
- Donald Friend (1915–1989), Australian artist
- Robert Fripp (born 1946), English musician
- Max Frisch (1911–1991), Swiss playwright and novelist
- Samuel Fritz (1654–1725, 1728 or 1730), Czech Jesuit missionary and explorer
- Bella Fromm (1890–1972), German wartime diarist and journalist
- Fujiwara no Kanezane (1149–1207), Japanese historian and Chief Minister
- Fujiwara no Michinaga (966–1028), Japanese statesman
- Fujiwara no Sanesuke (957–1046), Japanese Minister of the Right
- Fujiwara no Teika (1162–1241), Japanese scholar and calligrapher
- Buckminster Fuller (1895–1993), American designer and engineer
- Catherine Fulton (1829–1919), New Zealand community leader and suffragette
- Joseph Furttenbach (1591–1667), German architect and mathematician

== G ==
- Wanda Gág (1893–1946), American artist and children's author
- Hugh Gaitskell (1906–1963), English politician
- Arne Garborg (1851–1924), Norwegian writer
- David Gascoyne (1916–2001), English poet and translator
- Vladimir Gelfand (1923–1983), Soviet World War II soldier
- Eugenia Gertsyk (1878–1944), Russian/Soviet writer and translator
- Edward Gibbon (1737–1794), English historian and politician
- André Gide (1869–1951), French novelist and man of letters
- Chester Gillette (1883–1908), American murderer
- Allen Ginsberg (1926–1997), American beat poet
- Petr Ginz (1928–1944), Czechoslovak author, artist, editor, and Holocaust victim
- Carl Ferdinand Gjerdrum (1821–1902), Norwegian jurist and businessman
- Mary Gladstone (1847–1927), English political diarist
- Glückel of Hameln (1647–1727), German businesswoman and diarist in Yiddish
- Emperor Go-Nara (1495–1557), Japanese Emperor
- Joseph Goebbels (1897–1945), Nazi German Propaganda Minister
- Johann Wolfgang von Goethe (1749–1832), German writer and statesman
- Paul Goma (1935–2020), Romanian dissident writer
- Witold Gombrowicz (1904–1969), Polish writer
- Edmond de Goncourt (1822–1896), French writer and critic, brother of Jules
- Jules de Goncourt (1830–1870), French writer, brother of Edmond
- Gilles de Gouberville (1521–1578), French seigneur in Cotentin, Normandy
- Zalman Gradowski (1910–1944), Polish Jewish Holocaust victim
- Françoise de Graffigny (1695–1758), French novelist and salonnière
- Elizabeth Grant (1797–1885), Scottish traveler and writer
- Richard E. Grant (born 1957), Swazi/English actor
- Francine du Plessix Gray (born 1930), Franco-American author
- Julien Green (1900–1998), American author, writing in French
- Bob Greene (born 1947), American journalist
- Augusta, Lady Gregory (1852–1932), Irish dramatist and theater manager
- Joyce Grenfell (1910–1979), English actress and writer
- H. W. Gretton (1914–1983), New Zealand poet, teacher and soldier
- Charles Greville (1794–1865), English civil servant and cricketer
- Charlotte Forten Grimké (1837–1914), American abolitionist and women's rights activist
- Harriet Grote (1792–1878), English salonnière and biographer
- Benoîte Groult (1920–2016), French writer
- Eugénie de Guérin (1805–1848), French writer
- Che Guevara (1928–1967), Argentine revolutionary
- Hervé Guibert (1955–1991), French writer and AIDS activist
- Alec Guinness (1914–2000), English actor
- Pierre Guyotat (born 1940), French writer

== H ==
- Michihiko Hachiya (蜂谷道彦, 1903–1980), Japanese medical practitioner and Hiroshima survivor
- Peter Hagendorf (c. 1601 or 1602–1679), German mercenary in the Thirty Years' War
- Harry Robbins Haldeman (H. R. Haldeman, 1926–1993), American political aide involved in Watergate
- Franz Halder (1884–1972), German army general
- Peter Hall (1930–2017), English theater and film director
- Dag Hammarskjöld (1905–1961), Swedish Secretary-General of the United Nations
- Richard Hammond (born 1969), English TV presenter
- Emperor Hanazono (花園天皇, 1297–1348), Japanese Emperor
- Heinrich Hansjakob (1837–1916), German Catholic priest, historian and novelist
- Hara Takashi (原敬, 1856–1921), Japanese Prime Minister
- Mary Hardy (1733–1809), English farmer and brewer's wife from Whissonsett, Norfolk
- Saima Harmaja (1913–1937), Finnish poet and tuberculosis victim
- Eric Harris and Dylan Klebold (both 1981–1999), American schoolboy perpetrators of the Columbine High School massacre
- Howell Harris (1714–1773), Welsh preacher
- Keith Haring (1958–1990), American artist
- Leendert Hasenbosch (c.1695-c.1724), castaway Dutch sailor
- Olav H. Hauge (1908–1994), Norwegian horticulturalist and poet
- Jens Haugland (1910–1991), Norwegian jurist and politician
- Mireille Havet (1898–1932), French writer
- Peter Hawker (1786–1853), English army officer and sportsman
- Mary Hayden (1862–1942), Irish historian
- Benjamin Haydon (1786–1846), English painter
- Rutherford B. Hayes (1822–1893), 19th President of the United States
- Hedwig Elizabeth Charlotte of Holstein-Gottorp (1759–1818), documented life in the Swedish royal court and elite, 1775–1817
- Philip Henslowe (c. 1550–1615), English theatre producer
- Dorothea Herbert (c. 1767–1829), Irish poet
- Abel Herzberg (1893–1989), Dutch lawyer and writer
- Maria Heyde (1837–1913), German missionary and translator in Tibet
- Elisabeth von Heyking (1861–1925), German novelist and travel writer
- Eva Heyman (1931–1944), Hungarian Jewish teenager and Holocaust victim
- Patricia Highsmith (1923–1995), American author
- Etty Hillesum (1914–1943), Dutch Holocaust victim.
- George Hilton (1673–1725), English gentleman diarist
- Heinrich Himmler (1900–1945), Nazi and commander of the SS
- Edmund C. Hinde (1830–1909), American participant in the 1850s California Gold Rush
- Anna Maria Hinel (1924–1943), Polish underground activist and Holocaust victim
- Henry Hitchcock, American lawyer serving under General William Tecumseh Sherman
- Louisa Gurney Hoare (1784–1836), English writer on education
- Richard Hoare, second baronet (1758–1838), English antiquary and traveler
- Lady Margaret Hoby (1571–1633), English gentlewoman
- John Hobhouse (1786–1869), English politician and Member of Parliament
- Edith Holden, (1871–1920), English artist, teacher and naturalist
- William Holland (1746–1818), English country clergyman
- Hedvig Elisabeth Charlotte of Holstein-Gottorp (1759–1818), Queen of Sweden and Norway
- Philip Hone (1780–1851), American mayor and New York socialite
- Karen Horney (1885–1952), German psychoanalyst
- Gerard Manley Hopkins (1844–1889), English poet and priest
- Lyall Howard (1896–1955), Australian engineer and businessman
- Constantijn Huygens Jr. (1628–1697), 17th century Dutch astronomer

== I ==
- William Ralph Inge (1860–1954), English cleric and author
- Julia, Lady Inglis (1833–1904), English diarist with an account of the 1857 Siege of Lucknow
- Arthur Crew Inman (1895–1963), American poet who wrote a diary of 17 million words
- Christopher Isherwood (1904–1986), English-American novelist
- Ishin Sūden (以心崇伝, 1569–1633), Japanese Zen Rinzai monk and advisor
- Jarosław Iwaszkiewicz (1894–1980), Polish writer, poet and dramatist
- Izumi Shikibu (和泉式部, born c. 976), Japanese poet

== J ==
- Rosamond Jacob (1888–1960), Irish writer
- Violet Jacob (1863–1946), Scottish novelist and poet
- Alice James (1848–1892), American sister of novelist Henry and philosopher William
- Derek Jarman (1942–1994), English painter, filmmaker and gardener
- Carolina Maria de Jesus (1914–1977), Brazilian writer and social activist
- Jahanra Imam (1929–1994), Bangladeshi writer and political activist
- Joseph Jenkins (1818–1898), Welsh-born Australian swagman and self-educator
- Roy Jenkins (1920–2003), Welsh-born British politician and biographer
- Finn Varde Jespersen (1914–1944), Norwegian orienteer and air force lieutenant
- John Beauchamp Jones (1810–1866), American novelist and Confederate War Department clerk
- Samuel Johnson (1709-1784), scholar, writer and travel journal keeper
- Liz Jones (born 1958), English writer and journalist
- Ralph Josselin (1617–1683), rural English cleric (diary 1641–1683)
- Marcel Jouhandeau (1888–1979), French writer
- Stanislaus Joyce (1884–1955), Irish scholar and writer
- Ernst Jünger (1895–1998), German entomologist and Wehrmacht officer

== K ==
- Franz Kafka (1883–1924), German-language Jewish Czech novelist
- David Kahane (1903–1998), Polish-Jewish rabbi
- Frida Kahlo (1907–1954), Mexican painter
- Kajūji Mitsutoyo (勧修寺光豊, 1576–1612), Japanese noble
- Leszli Kálli (living), Colombian kidnap victim
- Zelig Kalmanovich (1885–1944), Litvak Jewish philologist, translator, historian, and community archivist
- Chaim Aron Kaplan (1880–1942), Polish-Jewish educator, Hebraist and Holocaust victim
- Wojciech Karpiński (born 1943), Polish critic and historian of ideas
- Erich Kästner (1899–1974), German satirist and children's writer
- Alfred Kazin (1915–1988), American writer and critic
- Ravindra Kelekar (1925–2010), Indian activist and writer
- Friedrich Kellner (1885–1970), German justice inspector and author
- Fanny Kemble (1809–1893), English actress
- Harry Graf Kessler (1868–1937), Anglo-German diplomat and writer
- Kōichi Kido (木戸幸一, 1889–1977), Japanese imperial advisor
- Søren Kierkegaard (1813–1855), Danish philosopher and theologian
- Francis Kilvert (1840–1879), English country cleric
- Kimura Kenkadō (木村蒹葭堂, 1736–1802), Japanese scholar and artist
- Cecil Harmsworth King (1901–1987), English newspaper proprietor
- William Lyon Mackenzie King (1874–1950), Canadian Prime Minister
- Lincoln Kirstein (1907–1996), American writer, impresario and connoisseur
- Aya Kitō (木藤亜也, 1962–1988), Japanese sufferer from spinocerebellar ataxia
- Paul Klee (1879–1940), Swiss-German painter
- Victor Klemperer (1881–1960), German scholar and writer
- Jochen Klepper (1903–1942), German writer and poet
- Robert Knopwood (1763–1938), English-born Australian clergyman
- Kobayashi Issa (小林一茶, 1763–1828), Japanese Jōdo Shinshū lay priest
- Věra Kohnová (1929–1942), Czechoslovak Holocaust victim
- David Koker (1921–1945), Dutch Holocaust victim
- Karl Koller (1898–1951), German air force general
- Käthe Kollwitz (1867–1945), German artist
- Zinaida Alekseyevna Kolmogorova (1937 - 1959) Russian student and victim of the Dyatlov Pass Incident
- Konoe Nobutada (近衛信尹, 1565–1614), Japanese courtier and poet
- Ina Konstantinova (1924–1944), Soviet World War II partisan
- Janusz Korczak (1878–1942), Polish Jewish pediatrician, educator, children's author and pedagogue
- Christiane Koren (1764–1815), Danish-born Norwegian poet and playwright
- Faustina Kowalska (1905–1938), Polish mystic, saint and secretary of Divine Mercy
- Teodora Krajewska (1854–1935), Polish-born Austro-Hungarian physician and writer
- Marianne Kraus (1765–1838), German painter and travel writer
- Herman Kruk (1897–1944), Polish-Jewish librarian and political activist
- Doppo Kunikida (国木田獨歩, 1871–1908), Japanese novelist and poet
- Mikhail Kuzmin (1872–1936), Russian writer

== L ==
- Selma Lagerlöf (1858–1940), Swedish writer, first female winner of Nobel Prize for Literature
- Luca Landucci (1436–1516), Florentine Italian apothecary
- Gladys Langford (1890–1972), London wartime schoolteacher
- Leib Langfus (died 1944), Polish rabbi and rabbinical judge
- Rutka Laskier (1929–1943), Polish Holocaust chronicler
- Nella Last (1889–1968), English housewife
- Mark Latham (born 1961), Australian Labor Party politician
- Valery Larbaud (1881–1957), French author
- Alan Lascelles (1887–1881), English royal courtier and civil servant
- Rutka Laskier (1929–1943), Polish Jewish Holocaust victim
- Friedrich Christian Laukhard (1757–1822), German novelist and theologian
- Mary Leadbeater (1758–1826), Irish writer
- Paul Léautaud (1872–1956), French writer and author of Le Journal Littéraire
- Jan Lechoń (1899–1956), Polish critic and diplomat
- James Lees-Milne (1908–1997), English biographer, historian and secretary of National Trust Country House Committee
- Madeleine L'Engle (1918–2007), American author
- Élisabeth Leseur (1866–1914), French mystic
- Pierre de L'Estoile (1546–1611), French collector
- Didier Lestrade (born 1958), French author and AIDS activist
- C. S. Lewis (1898–1963), Irish-born English children's writer and theologian
- Norman Lewis (1908–2003), English journalist and travel writer
- Anne Morrow Lindbergh (1906–2001), American wife of aviator, who described the kidnapping of their child
- Rywka Lipszyc (1929 – c. 1945), Polish Jewish Holocaust victim
- Anne Lister (1791–1840), English landowner, diarist and lesbian
- R. H. Bruce Lockhart (1887–1970), English secret agent and author
- Frank Pakenham, 7th Earl of Longford (1905–2001), English politician and reformer
- Pierre Louÿs (1870–1925), French writer
- Courtney Love (born 1964), American actress and rock musician
- Marie Belloc Lowndes (1868–1947), French-born English novelist and playwright, sister of Hilaire Belloc
- Nina Lugovskaya (1918–1993), Soviet Russian artist (diary 1928–1937)
- Narcissus Luttrell (1657–1732), English historian and politician

== M ==
- Dónall Mac Amhlaigh (1926–1989), Irish writer
- Elizabeth Macarthur (1766–1850), English-born Australian pastoralist and merchant
- Henry Machyn (1496/1498–1563), English clothier
- Alasdair Maclean (1926–1994), Scottish poet
- Sarah Broom Macnaughtan (1864–1916), Scottish-born novelist and wartime social volunteer
- Harold Macmillan (1894–1986), UK Prime Minister
- William Macready (1793–1873), English actor
- Maurice Maeterlinck (1862–1949), Belgian writer
- Alma Mahler-Werfel (1879–1964), German musician, wife of Gustav Mahler
- Ruth Maier (1920–1942), Austrian Jewish woman who died in Auschwitz
- Charles Malik (1906–1987), Lebanese philosopher and diplomat
- Judith Malina (1926–2015), German-born American actress and co-founder of Living Theatre
- Julie Manet (1878–1966), French painter and art collector
- Edna Manley (1900–1987), Jamaican sculptor and painter
- Petru Manoliu (1903–1976), Romanian novelist and newspaper editor
- Klaus Mann (1906–1949), German-born American writer
- Thomas Mann (1875–1955), German novelist and Nobel Prize in Literature winner
- John Manningham (died 1622), English lawyer
- Katherine Mansfield (1888–1923), New Zealand modernist fiction writer
- Mathieu Marais (1665–1737), French jurist
- Marie of Romania (1875–1938), English-born Romanian queen consort
- Atanasie Marian Marienescu (1830–1915), Austro-Hungarian-born Romanian folklorist
- Joachim Martin (1842–1897), French carpenter
- Roger Martin du Gard (1881–1958), French writer
- Helena Apolonia Massalska (1763–1815), Polish noblewoman
- Mary Mathew (1724–1777), Irish householder
- Sarah Mathew (c. 1805–1890), New Zealand housewife
- Matsudair Ietada (松平家忠, 1555–1600), Japanese samurai
- Christopher Matthew (born 1939), English writer and broadcaster
- Matsuo Bashō (松尾芭蕉, 1644–1694), Japanese haiku and renga poet
- Megan McCafferty (born 1973), American YA author
- Georgiana McCrae (1804–1890), English-born Australian painter
- Kit McNaughton (c. 1887–1953), Australian wartime nurse
- Durgaram Mehta (1809–1876), Indian Gujarati reformer and essayist
- H. L. Mencken (1880–1956), American essayist and scholar
- Thomas Merton (1915–1968), Trappist monk and writer
- Wojciech Miaskowski (died c. 1654), Polish nobleman and Sejm member
- Fujiwara no Michinaga (藤原道長?, 966–1028), Japanese poet and statesman
- Michitsuna no Haha (c. 935–995), Japanese writer
- Jo Mihaly (1902–1989), German dancer and writer
- Minamoto no Michichika (源通親, 1149–1202), Japanese statesman
- Clara Milburn (1883-1961), Wartime (WWII) English housewife
- Hallie Eustace Miles (1868–1955), English writer, restaurateur, and activist
- Séndi Miller (1929–2024), Slovak student and Holocaust survivor
- Pierre Minet (1909–1975), French writer
- André François Miot de Mélito (1762–1841), French statesman and scholar
- Naomi Mitchison (1897–1999), Scottish novelist and poet
- Petter Moen (1901–1944), Norwegian resistance fighter
- George Fletcher Moore (1798–1886), Irish-born Australian settler, explorer and linguist
- Alanis Morissette (born 1974), Canadian singer and songwriter
- Yoko Moriwaki (森脇瑤子, 1932–1945), Japanese diarist and Hiroshima victim
- Helena Morley (1880–1970), Brazilian young-adult writer
- Roger Morrice (1628–1702), English Puritan minister and political commentator
- Mary Morris (1921–1997), Irish wartime nurse
- Ignaz Moscheles (1794–1870), Bohemian composer and pianist
- René Mouchotte (1914–1943), French air force pilot
- Louis Mountbatten, 1st Earl Mountbatten of Burma (1900–1979), UK naval officer and statesman
- Mary Braidwood Mowle (1827–1857), English-born Australian settler
- Sławomir Mrożek (1930–2013), Polish dramatist and cartoonist
- Malcolm Muggeridge (1903–1990), English journalist and satirist
- Lena Mukhina (1924–1991), Soviet teenager during Siege of Leningrad
- Chris Mullin (born 1947), English Labour politician and writer
- Arthur Munby (1828–1910), English poet, barrister, and solicitor
- Murasaki Shikibu (紫式部, c. 973 or 978 – c. 1014 or 1031), Japanese novelist and lady in waiting
- Iris Murdoch (1919–1999), Anglo-Irish novelist
- Costin Murgescu (1919–1989), Romanian economist and diplomat
- Hilda Murrell (1906-1984), horticulturalist and environmental activist
- Robert Musil (1880–1942), Austrian novelist and philosopher

== N ==
- Marc-Édouard Nabe (born 1958), French writer, painter and guitarist
- Kafū Nagai (永井荷風, 1879–1959), Japanese author and playwright
- Takashi Nagai (永井隆, 1908–1951), Japanese Catholic physician and Nagasaki survivor
- Nakayama Tadachika (中山忠親, 1131–1195), Japanese court noble and writer
- Zofia Nałkowska (1884–1954), Polish writer and dramatist
- Odd Nansen (1901–1973), Norwegian architect and humanitarian
- Stevie Nicks (born 1948), American singer/songwriter, member of Fleetwood Mac
- Harold Nicolson (1886–1968), English diplomat, politician and author
- Bronislava Nijinska (1891–1972), Polish/Russian ballet dance
- Vaslav Nijinsky (1890–1950), Russian ballet dancer and choreographer
- Lady Nijō (後深草院二条, 1258 – post–1307), Japanese noblewoman
- Anaïs Nin (1903–1977), Cuban/French lover of Henry Miller, writer of erotica, pornography and poetry
- Leonard Nolens (1947-2025), Belgian poet
- Konrad Nordahl (1897–1975), Norwegian trade unionist and politician

== O ==
- Joyce Carol Oates (born 1938), American author
- Akinpelu Obisesan (1889–1963), Nigerian businessman and politician
- Florence Vere O'Brien (1854–1936), English-born Irish philanthropist and craftwoman
- Tomas O'Crohan (1856–1937), Irish islander
- Irina Odoyevtseva (1895–1990), Russian/Soviet poet and novelist
- Maura O'Halloran (1955-1982), Irish-American Zen Buddhist monk
- John Olsen (born 1945), Australian artist
- Willem Oltmans (1925–2004), Dutch journalist
- Tarlach Ó Mealláin (fl. 1641–1650), Irish Franciscan friar
- Ōoka Tadasuke (大岡忠相, 1677–1762), Japanese samurai
- Arne Ording (1898–1967), Norwegian historian and politician
- Iris Origo (1902–1988), English-born biographer
- John Oglander (1585–1655), English politician
- Joe Orton (1933–1967), English playwright
- George Orwell (1903–1950), English journalist, essayist and critic
- Einar Østvedt (1903–1980), Norwegian historian and educator
- Amhlaoibh Ó Súilleabháin (1780–1837), Irish draper and teacher
- Cynthia Ozick (born 1928), American author

== P ==
- Walburga, Lady Paget (1839–1929), German writer and friend of Queen Victoria
- Michael Palin (born 1943), English Monty Python team member, actor and travel writer
- Jim Parker (1897–1980), New Zealand sportsman and business executive
- Pauline Parker (born 1938), New Zealand-born matricide
- Frances Partridge (née Marshall), (1900–2004), English writer
- George S. Patton (1885–1945), American World War II general
- Georg Pausch (c. 1740–1795 or 1796), German soldier in British service
- Claus Pavels (1769–1822), Norwegian bishop
- Cesare Pavese (1908–1950), Italian poet, novelist and critic
- John Otunba Payne (1839–1906), Nigerian court registrar
- Nicholas Peacock (fl. mid–18th c.), Irish farmer
- Charles Willson Peale (1741–1827), Colonial American painter
- Drew Pearson (1897–1969), American journalist and broadcaster
- Giuseppe Bencivenni Pelli (1729–1808), Italian civil servant and essayist
- Elizabeth Pepys (1640–1669), French-born wife of Samuel Pepys
- Emily Pepys (1833–1877), English child diarist (diary 1844–1845)
- Samuel Pepys (1633–1703), English civil servant (diary 1660–1669)
- Elizabeth Percy, Duchess of Northumberland (1716–1776), English peeress
- Calel Perechodnik (1916–1944), Polish Jewish ghetto policeman and Holocaust victim
- Diane Pernet (living), Paris-based American fashion critic
- Frances Dallam Peter (1843–1864), United States Civil War diarist
- Gabrielė Petkevičaitė-Bitė (1861–1943), Lithuanian fiction writer
- Tom Pickard (born 1946), English poet and filmmaker
- Ricardo Piglia (1941–2017), Argentine critic and novelist
- Karl Pilkington, English radio and TV personality
- Ananda Ranga Pillai (1709–1761), Indian dubash of French India
- Alejandra Pizarnik (1936–1972), Argentine poet
- Josep Pla (1897–1981), Catalan writer
- Sylvia Plath (1932–1963), American poet
- Thomas Platter the Younger (1574–1628), Swiss-born physician and traveller
- James K. Polk (1795–1849), 11th President of the United States
- John William Polidori (1795–1821), English poet, writer and physician
- Grigore T. Popa (1892–1948), Romanian physician and intellectual
- Agnes Porter (c. 1752–1814), English governess
- S. K. Pottekkatt (1913–1982), Indian writer and politician
- Beatrix Potter (1866–1943), English children's book writer and illustrator
- Liane de Pougy (1869–1950), French dancer and courtesan
- Anthony Powell (1905–2000), English novelist and biographer
- Dawn Powell (1896–1965), American writer
- Catherine Pozzi (1882–1934), French writer, Paul Valery's lover
- Christen Pram (1756–1821), Norwegian/Danish economist and writer
- Hana Maria Pravda (1916–2008), Czechoslovak/English actress and Holocaust survivor
- Mikhail Prishvin (1873–1954), Russian/Soviet writer
- Ferenc Pulszky (1814–1897), Hungarian politician
- Sextil Pușcariu (1877–1948), Austro-Hungarian-born Romanian linguist and philologist
- Barbara Pym (1913–1980), English novelist

== Q ==
- Qiu Miaojin (邱妙津, 1969–1995), Taiwanese novelist
- Thomas De Quincey (1785–1859), English man of letters
- Raymond Queneau (1903–1976), French writer

== R ==
- John Rabe (1882–1950), German diplomat and Nazi official
- Lillemor Rachlew (1902–1983), Norwegian Antarctic explorer
- Sheikh Mujibur Rahman (1920–1925), President and later Prime Minister of Bangladesh
- Raiden Tameemon (雷電爲右衞門, 1767–1865), Japanese sumo wrestler
- Francisc Rainer (1874–1944), Austro-Hungarian-born Romanian pathologist and anthropologist
- Catherine Hester Ralfe (1831–1912), New Zealand dressmaker and teacher
- Hermione, Countess of Ranfurly (1913–2001), English secretary and diplomatic employee
- Ronald Reagan (1911–2004), 40th President of the United States
- Märta Helena Reenstierna (1753–1841), Swedish gentlewoman
- Wilhelm Reich (1897–1956), Austrian physician and psychoanalyst
- Charles à Court Repington (1858–1925), English military officer and war correspondent
- Nicolas-Edme Rétif (1734–1806), French novelist
- Alan Rickman (1946–2016), English actor and director
- Charles Ritchie (1906–1995), Canadian diplomat
- Henry Crabb Robinson (1775–1887), English lawyer
- Gérard Rondeau (1953–2016), French photographer
- Theodore Roosevelt (1858–1919), 26th President of the United States
- Ned Rorem (1923–2022), American composer
- Henry Rollins (born 1961), American singer for Black Flag
- Barbara Rosenthal (born 1948), American avant-garde New Media artist/writer/performer
- Radu R. Rosetti (1877–1949), Romanian general and military historian
- Yitskhok Rudashevski (1927–1943), Lithuanian Jewish teenager who died in the Holocaust
- Everett Ruess (1914–1934), American artist, poet and explorer
- Peter Rühmkorf (1929–2008), German writer
- John Ruskin (1819–1900), English art critic and philanthropist
- Osborne Russell (1814-1884), American mountain man and politician
- Robert Russell (1808–1900), English-born Australian architect
- Dudley Ryder (1691–1756), English Lord Chief Justice (diary 1715–16)

== S ==
- Jacques Sadoul (1881–1956), French lawyer, politician and writer
- María Sáez de Vernet (1800–1858), Argentine resident in the Falkland Islands
- Hakeem Muhammad Saeed (1920–1998), Indian/Pakistani medical researcher and philanthropist
- Robert de Saint-Jean (1901–1987), French writer and journalist
- Kazimierz Sakowicz (1894–1944), Polish journalist, soldier and resistance operator
- Rubino Romeo Salmonì (1920–2011), Italian author and Holocaust survivor
- Mariquita Sánchez de Thompson (1786–1868), Argentine society hostess
- George Sand (1804–1876), French writer
- Marino Sanuto (1466–1536), Venetian historian
- May Sarton (1912–1995), American poet and novelist
- Jean-Paul Sartre (1905–1980), French writer and philosopher
- Rudy Sarzo (born 1950), Cuban-American rock bassist, notably of Ozzy Osbourne fame
- Siegfried Sassoon (1886–1967), English poet and author
- Eisaku Satō (佐藤榮作, 1901–1975), Japanese Prime Minister
- Tanya Savicheva (1930–1944), Soviet child in the World War II Siege of Leningrad
- Jules Schelvis (1921–2016), Dutch historian and Holocaust survivor
- Arthur M. Schlesinger, Jr. (1917–2007), American historian and political adviser
- Norbert Schmelzer (1921–2008), Dutch Catholic politician and diplomat
- Frederik Schmidt (1771–1840), Danish-born Norwegian priest and poet
- Robert Falcon Scott (1868–1912), English Antarctic explorer
- Sir Walter Scott (1771–1832), Scottish novelist and poet
- Sei Shōnagon (清少納言, c. 966–1017 or 1025), Japanese court lady and writer
- Bartholomew Sharp (1650-1702), English buccaneer and pirate
- George Bernard Shaw (1856–1950), Irish Nobel Prize-winning playwright
- Mary Shelley (1797–1851), English novelist and travel writer
- Betsy Sheridan (1758–1837), Irish writer, sister of the satirist Richard Brinsley Sheridan
- Robert Shields (1918–2007), American teacher
- Efim Shifrin (born 1956), Soviet/Russian actor and singer
- Michael Shiner (1805–1880), American freed slave and Navy Yard worker
- William L. Shirer (1904–1993), American journalist and contemporary historian
- Emily Shore (1819–1839), English young adult
- Dawid Sierakowiak (1924–1843), Jewish teenager who died in the Holocaust
- Malla Silfverstolpe (1782–1861), Swedish salon hostess
- Elizabeth Simcoe (1762–1850), English wife of Lieutenant Governor of Upper Canada
- Ion Șiugariu (1914–1945), Romanian poet
- Nikki Sixx (born 1958), American bassist/songwriter for Mötley Crüe
- John Skinner (1772–1839), English cleric and antiquarian
- Philip Slier (1923–1943), Dutch typesetter and Holocaust victim
- Elizabeth Smart (born 1987), American abduction victim and broadcaster
- Konstantin Somov (1869–1939), Russian painter
- William Soutar (1898–1943), Scottish poet
- Alexander Brodie Spark (1792–1856), Scottish-born Australian merchant and settler
- Johan Gabriel Sparwenfeld (1655–1727), Swedish diplomat and linguist
- Stephen Spender (1909–1995), English poet
- Renia Spiegel (1924–1942), Polish Jewish Holocaust victim
- John Steinbeck (1902–1968), American novelist
- Nicolae Steinhardt (1912–1989), Romanian writer and monk
- Stendhal (Marie-Henri Beyle, 1783–1842), French novelist
- Frances Stevenson (1888–1972), English mistress and second wife of British Prime Minister David Lloyd George
- Margaret Stevenson (c. 1807–1874), English-born Australian satirist
- Robert Louis Stevenson (1850–1894), Scottish novelist, poet and travel writer
- Joseph Stilwell (1883–1946), American World War II general
- Joseph Stock (1740–1813), Irish Protestant bishop
- Constantin T. Stoika (1892–1916), Romanian poet, translator and army officer
- Gordon Stott, Lord Stott (1909–1999), Scottish advocate
- Richard Strauss (1864–1949), German composer
- George Templeton Strong (1820–1875), American lawyer
- Roy Strong (born 1935), English gardener and aesthete
- Sufia Kamal (1911–1999), Bangladeshi writer and political activist
- Sugawara no Takasue no musume (菅原孝標女, c. 1008 – after 1059), Japanese writer
- Sukemasa Irie (入江相政, 1905–1985), Japanese essayist and Grand Chamberlain of Japan
- Lou Sullivan (1951–1991), American author and transgender activist
- Rosemary Sutcliff (1920–1992), English historical novelist for children and young adults
- John Swete (1752–1821), English cleric and artist
- Richard Symonds (1617–1660), English Civil War diaries

== T ==
- Jun Takami (高見順, 1907–1965), Japanese novelist and poet
- Takizawa Bakin (曲亭馬琴, 1867–1948), Japanese gesaku writer
- Fanny Tarnow (1779–1862), German fiction and non-fiction writer
- Pyotr Ilyich Tchaikovsky (1840–1893), Russian composer
- Henry Teonge (1620–1690), English naval chaplain (diaries 1675–76 and 1678–79)
- Daniel Terdiman (living), American award-winning journalist
- Carl Tersmeden (1715–1797), Swedish admiral
- Kathleen Tipper (born 1919), English wartime clerk
- Mary Thomas (1787–1835), English-born Australian poet
- John Thomlinson (1692–1761), English cleric (diary 1717–1722)
- Henry David Thoreau (1817–1862), American author and philosopher
- Hester Thrale (1740–1821), Welsh author, friend and confidante of Samuel Johnson
- Jean de Tinan (1874–1898), French writer
- Sophia Tolstaya (1844–1919), Russian wife of author Leo Tolstoy
- Leo Tolstoy (1828–1910), Russian novelist and social reformer
- Wolfe Tone (1763-1798) Irish politician
- William Treloar (1843–1923), English haberdasher and Lord Mayor of London (diary 1906–1907)
- Govardhanram Tripathi (1855–1907), Indian Gujarati-language writer
- Melesina Trench (1768–1827), Irish writer and poet
- Anne Truitt (1921–2004), American artist
- Harry S. Truman (1884–1972), 33rd President of the United States
- Meta Truscott, (1917–2014), Australian chronicler and local historian (diaries 1934–2014)
- Mikhail Tsekhanovsky (1889–1965), Russian/Soviet artist and illustrator
- Marina Ivanovna Tsvetaeva (1892–1941), Russian poet and writer
- George Albert Tuck (1884–1981), New Zealand builder and soldier
- Thomas Turner (1729–1793), English shopkeeper
- Anna Tyszkiewicz (1779–1867), Polish noblewoman

== U ==
- Emperor Uda (宇多天皇, 866–931), Japanese Emperor
- Ida Hunt Udall (1858–1915), American homesteader
- Matome Ugaki (宇垣纏, 1890–1945), Japanese admiral
- Umewaka Minoru I (初世梅若実, 1828–1909), Japanese Noh actor

== V ==
- Krishna Baldev Vaid (1927–2020), Indian fiction writer and playwright
- C. Raja Raja Varma (died 1905), Indian painter
- Marie Vassiltchikov (1917–1978), Russian princess involved in plot to kill Hitler
- Gerrit de Veer (c. 1570 – c. 1598), Dutch naval officer
- Queen Victoria (1819–1901), British queen and empress
- Alfred de Vigny (1797–1863), French writer
- Léonie Villard (1890–1962), French critic and university professor
- Renée Vivien (1877–1909), French and English writer
- Alice Voinescu (1885–1961), Romanian writer, translator and university professor

== W ==
- Cosima Wagner (1837–1930), German daughter of Franz Liszt, second wife of Richard Wagner
- Richard Wagner (1813–1873), German composer
- Alice Walker (born 1944), American author
- Jakob Walter (1788–1864), German soldier in the Napoleonic Wars
- Sabrina Ward Harrison (born 1975), Canadian artist and author
- Andy Warhol (1928–1987), American artist
- Mary Rich, Countess of Warwick (1625–1678), Irish maid of honour
- Evelyn Waugh (1903–1966), English novelist
- Beatrice Webb (1858–1943), English sociologist and social reformer
- Simone Weil (1909–1943), French philosopher
- Gisela Weimann (born 1943), German multimedia artist
- Hermann Weinsberg (1518–1597), German city councilor in Cologne
- Johan Peter Weisse (1832–1886), Norwegian philologist
- Denton Welch (1915–1948), English writer and painter
- John Wesley (1703–1791), English theologian and founder of the Methodist movement
- Algernon West (1832–1921), English civil servant
- Alexander Whisker (1819–1907), New Zealand soldier
- Gilbert White (1720–1793), English naturalist and Anglican cleric
- Opal Whiteley (1897–1992), American naturalist and nature writer
- Margaret Whitlam (1919–2012), Australian Olympic swimmer, writer and social campaigner
- Dorothy Payne Whitney (1887–1968), American social activist and lecturer
- Elie Wiesel (1928–2016), Romanian-American author
- John Wilkes (1725–1797), English journalist and politician
- Kenneth Williams (1926–1988), English comic actor
- Charlotte Williams-Wynn (1807–1869), English gentlewoman
- Katherine Wilmot (c. 1773–1824), Irish traveller
- Edmund Wilson (1895–1972), American writer and critic
- Edward Adrian Wilson (1872–1912), English naturalist and Antarctic explorer
- Sir Henry Wilson, 1st Baronet (1864–1922), English military officer
- William Windham (1750–1810), English statesman and orator
- Anna Green Winslow (1759–1780), American child diarist
- David Wojnarowicz (1954–1992), American painter and performer
- Knut Getz Wold (1915–1987), Norwegian economist and civil servant
- Robert Woodford (1606–1664), English lawyer
- James Woodforde (1740–1803), English rural cleric
- Charles Woodmason (c. 1720–1789), American author, poet and loyalist (South Carolina journal late 1760s)
- Wilford Woodruff (1807–1898), 4th President of the Church of Jesus Christ of Latter-day Saints
- Virginia Woolf (1882–1941), English author and feminist
- Dorothy Wordsworth (1771–1855), English poet, sister of William Wordsworth
- Woodrow Wyatt (1918–1997), American politician and journalist
- Joan Wyndham (1921–2007), English memoirist

== Y ==
- Yi Kyu-won (이규원, 1833–1901), Korean military official
- Yi Sun-sin (1545–1598)
- Zina D. H. Young (1821–1901), President of the Relief Society

== Z ==
- Mircea Zaciu (1928–2000), Romanian critic and literary historian
- Zheng Xiaoxu (1860–1938), Chinese politician, poet and calligrapher
- Stefan Żeromski (1864–1925), Polish novelist and dramatist
- Polina Zherebtsova (born 1985), Russian Chechen documentarian and poet
- Karl von Zinzendorf (1739–1813), Saxon Austrian civil servant
- A. L. Zissu (1888–1956), Romanian writer and Jewish spokesman
- Ludwik Żychliński (1837–1901), Polish military officer
- Teodor Żychliński (1830–1909), Polish herald and author

== Sortable table of diarists ==
This information is available as a sortable table:

Sortable table of diarists
| Last name (Note: Last name is usually the final name given. Middle names are ignored (e.g. George Bubb Dodington) except when it is known to be a double-barrelled surname (e.g. Violet Bonham Carter). Names with a nobiliary or onomastic particle include the particle (e.g. d’Ewes and de Brakelond are listed under D). Names with a generational suffix have the suffix ignored (e.g. William Byrd II is listed as Byrd). Japanese, Korean, & Chinese names are given in full, with the surname or family name first. Vietnamese names give the surname or family name first (e.g. Đặng Thùy Trâm is listed as Đặng). Pseudonyms are given as the main name (e.g. Lewis Carroll). Glückel of Hameln is listed as Glückel of Hameln. Marie of Romania is listed as Marie of Romania. Arishima Takeo is the correct name for Takeo Arishima.) | Wikipedia article | Life span | Birth (Note: Approximate dates are simplifed and given in italics to facilitate sorting.) | Death (Note: Approximate dates are simplifed and given in italics to facilitate sorting.) | Notes |
|---|---|---|---|---|---|
| Abboud | Layal Abboud | 1982– | 1982 | | Lebanese singer and dancer |
| Abdullahu | Rreze Abdullahu | 1990– | 1990 | | Kosovo Albanian writer |
| Abutsu-ni | Abutsu-ni | 1222–1283 | 1222 | 1283 | Japanese nun and poet |
| Ackerley | J. R. Ackerley | 1896–1967 | 1896 | 1967 | Joe Randolph Ackerley, English literary editor and biographer |
| Ackermann | Louise-Victorine Ackermann | 1813–1890 | 1813 | 1890 | French writer and philosopher |
| Acland | Lady Harriet Acland | 1750–1815 | 1750 | 1815 | English noblewoman and nurse |
| Adams | John Adams | 1735–1826 | 1735 | 1826 | 2nd President of the United States, statesman and diplomat |
| Adams | John Quincy Adams | 1767–1848 | 1767 | 1848 | 6th President of the United States, statesman and diplomat |
| Adamson | Catherine Adamson | 1868–1925 | 1868 | 1925 | New Zealand homemaker |
| Aderca | Felix Aderca | 1891–1962 | 1891 | 1962 | Romanian novelist, playwright and poet |
| Agate | James Agate | 1877–1947 | 1877 | 1947 | English writer and critic |
| al-Radi | Nuha al-Radi | 1941–2004 | 1941 | 2004 | Iraqi potter and painter |
| al-Windawi | Thura al-Windawi | 1983– | 1983 | | Iraqi pharmacologist and political commentator |
| Alcott | Louisa May Alcott | 1832–1888 | 1832 | 1888 | American novelist |
| Allingham | William Allingham | 1824–1889 | 1824 | 1889 | Irish poet |
| Ambrose | Isaac Ambrose | 1604–1664 | 1604 | 1664 | English Puritan |
| Amiel | Henri-Frédéric Amiel | 1821–1881 | 1821 | 1881 | Swiss philosopher, poet and critic |
| Andræ | Hansine Andræ | 1817–1898 | 1817 | 1898 | Danish feminist |
| Apollinaire | Guillaume Apollinaire | 1880–1918 | 1880 | 1918 | French writer |
| Arbuthnot | Harriet Arbuthnot | 1793–1834 | 1793 | 1834 | English associate of Arthur Wellesley, 1st Duke of Wellington |
| Arishima Takeo | Takeo Arishima | 1878–1923 | 1878 | 1923 | Japanese novelist |
| Artaud | Antonin Artaud | 1896–1948 | 1896 | 1948 | French writer and critic |
| Asquith | Lady Cynthia Asquith | 1887–1960 | 1887 | 1960 | English writer |
| Aubert | Elise Aubert | 1837–1909 | 1837 | 1909 | Norwegian fiction and non-fiction writer |
| Aya Kitō | Aya Kitō | 1962–1988 | 1962 | 1988 | Japanese sufferer from spinocerebellar ataxia |
| Ayton | Charles John Ayton | 1846–1922 | 1846 | 1922 | New Zealand gold miner and rabbiter |
| Badin | Gustav Badin | 1747–1822 | 1747 | 1822 | Swedish court servant |
| Baker | Elizabeth Baker | 1720–1797 | 1720 | 1797 | English secretary and geologist |
| Balfour | David Paton Balfour | 1841–1894 | 1841 | 1894 | New Zealand sheep farmer and roading supervisor |
| Ballard | Martha Ballard | 1735–1812 | 1735 | 1812 | American midwife and healer |
| Bamford | Samuel Bamford | 1788–1872 | 1788 | 1872 | English dialect poet and dialect theorist |
| Banuș | Maria Banuș | 1914–1999 | 1914 | 1999 | Romanian poet and essayist |
| Banzet | Sara Banzet | 1745–1774 | 1745 | 1774 | French educator |
| Baranga | Aurel Baranga | 1913–1979 | 1913 | 1979 | Romanian playwright and poet |
| Barbellion | W. N. P. Barbellion | 1889–1919 | 1889 | 1919 | Pseudonym of Bruce Frederick Cummings, English naturalist, essayist & & writer |
| Barker | Mary Anne Barker | 1831–1911 | 1831 | 1911 | Jamaican-born Australian writer |
| Barwick | Archie Barwick | 1890–1966 | 1890 | 1966 | Australian farmer and soldier |
| Basheer | Vaikom Muhammad Basheer | 1908–1994 | 1908 | 1994 | Indian independence activist and writer |
| Bashkirtseff | Marie Bashkirtseff | 1858–1884 | 1858 | 1884 | Ukrainian painter and sculptor (in French) |
| Bason | Fred Bason | 1907–1973 | 1907 | 1973 | English bookseller, broadcaster and writer |
| Bass | Franta Bass | 1930–1944 | 1930 | 1944 | Jewish Czech child poet, Holocaust victim |
| Baxter | Annie Maria Baxter | 1816–1905 | 1816 | 1905 | English-born Australian housewife |
| Beard | Peter Hill Beard | 1938– | 1938 | | American photographer in Africa |
| Beaton | Cecil Beaton | 1904–1980 | 1904 | 1980 | English fashion, portrait and war photographer |
| Ben no Naishi | Ben no Naishi | 1220–1270 | 1220 | 1270 | Japanese court lady and poet |
| Benedict | Ruth Benedict | 1887–1948 | 1887 | 1948 | American anthropologist |
| Benn | Tony Benn | 1925–2014 | 1925 | 2014 | English politician |
| Bennett | Alan Bennett | 1934– | 1934 | | English writer and playwright |
| Bennett | Arnold Bennett | 1867–1931 | 1867 | 1931 | English novelist |
| Benson | A. C. Benson | 1862–1925 | 1862 | 1925 | Arthur Christopher Benson, English academic, biographer and poet |
| Berendes | Märta Berendes | 1639–1717 | 1639 | 1717 | Swedish mistress of the robes |
| Bergholz | Olga Bergholz | 1910–1975 | 1910 | 1975 | Soviet poet and playwright |
| Bergounioux | Pierre Bergounioux | 1949– | 1949 | | French writer |
| Berr | Hélène Berr | 1921–1945 | 1921 | 1945 | French writer on Nazi occupation of Paris |
| Bestall | Alfred Bestall | 1892–1986 | 1892 | 1986 | English illustrator, best known for Rupert Bear stories |
| Betham | Mary Matilda Betham | 1776–1852 | 1776 | 1852 | English poet, woman of letters and miniature portrait painter. |
| Bilbrough | Ethel Bilbrough | 1868–1951 | 1868 | 1951 | English First World War diarist and artist |
| Bloy | Léon Bloy | 1846–1917 | 1846 | 1917 | French novelist, poet and pamphleteer |
| Blundell | Nicholas Blundell | 1669–1737 | 1669 | 1737 | English squire |
| Blunt | Wilfrid Scawen Blunt | 1840–1922 | 1840 | 1922 | English poet and writer |
| Bodichon | Barbara Bodichon | 1827–1891 | 1827 | 1891 | English educationalist, feminist and traveller |
| Bollinger | George Wallace Bollinger | 1890–1917 | 1890 | 1917 | New Zealand soldier |
| Bonham Carter | Violet Bonham Carter | 1887–1969 | 1887 | 1969 | English politician, daughter of Prime Minister H. H. Asquith |
| Bontempi | Teresina Bontempi | 1883–1968 | 1883 | 1968 | Swiss political activist |
| Booth | Stanley Booth | 1942– | 1942 | | American music journalist |
| Boruwłaski | Józef Boruwłaski | 1739–1837 | 1739 | 1837 | Polish dwarf musician |
| Boswell | James Boswell | 1740–1795 | 1740 | 1795 | Scottish chronicler of Samuel Johnson |
| Boyle | Jimmy Boyle | 1944– | 1944 | | Scottish gangster, sculptor and novelist |
| Bräker | Ulrich Bräker | 1735–1798 | 1735 | 1798 | Swiss autodidact and writer |
| Brandreth | Gyles Brandreth | 1948– | 1948 | | English writer and politician |
| Brant | Alice Dayrell Caldeira Brant | 1880–1970 | 1880 | 1970 | Brazilian teenage diarist |
| Brecht | Bertolt Brecht | 1898–1956 | 1898 | 1956 | German playwright, poet and politician |
| Breen | Patrick Breen | 1795–1868 | 1795 | 1868 | American member of The Donner Party |
| Bremer | Arthur Bremer | 1950– | 1950 | | American attempted assassin of George Wallace |
| Brereton | Sir William Brereton | 1604–1661 | 1604 | 1661 | 1st Baronet Brereton, English politician and Roundhead military commander |
| Brittain | Vera Brittain | 1893–1970 | 1893 | 1970 | English author and feminist |
| Britten | Benjamin Britten | 1913–1976 | 1913 | 1976 | English composer |
| Brown | Ford Madox Brown | 1821–1893 | 1821 | 1893 | French-born English painter |
| Bruce | David Bruce | 1898–1977 | 1898 | 1977 | American ambassador |
| Bryceson | Nathaniel Bryceson | 1826–1911 | 1826 | 1911 | English clerk |
| Bryn | Thomas Bryn | 1782–1827 | 1782 | 1827 | Norwegian jurist and civil servant |
| Bucuța | Emanoil Bucuța | 1887–1946 | 1887 | 1946 | Romanian novelist, critic and poet |
| Bujnicki | Kazimierz Bujnicki | 1788–1878 | 1788 | 1878 | Polish writer |
| Bull | Deborah Bull | 1963– | 1963 | | English ballet dancer and writer |
| Bullard | Reader Bullard | 1885–1976 | 1885 | 1976 | English diplomat |
| Bunin | Ivan Bunin | 1870–1953 | 1870 | 1953 | Russian/Soviet novelist |
| Burney | Fanny Burney | 1752–1840 | 1752 | 1840 | English novelist, playwright and biographer |
| Burton | Richard Burton | 1925–1984 | 1925 | 1984 | Welsh actor |
| Bury | Elizabeth Bury | 1644–1720 | 1644 | 1720 | English nonconformist |
| Butler | Eleanor Charlotte Butler | 1739–1829 | 1739 | 1829 | One of the once controversial Ladies of Llangollen |
| Butts | Mary Butts | 1890–1937 | 1890 | 1937 | English writer |
| Byrd | William Byrd II | 1674–1744 | 1674 | 1744 | Colonial American diarist |
| Byron | Lord Byron | 1788–1824 | 1788 | 1824 | English poet and traveler |
| Cabot | Meg Cabot | 1967– | 1967 | | American YA author |
| Cadogan | Alexander Cadogan | 1884–1968 | 1884 | 1968 | English diplomat and civil servant |
| Calaferte | Louis Calaferte | 1928–1994 | 1928 | 1994 | French novelist and essayist |
| Călinescu | Matei Călinescu | 1934–2009 | 1934 | 2009 | Romanian critic and professor |
| Campbell | Alastair Campbell | 1957– | 1957 | | Anglo-Scottish journalist, broadcaster and author |
| Campbell | Thomas Campbell | 1733–1795 | 1733 | 1795 | Irish Protestant minister and travel writer |
| Camprubí | Zenobia Camprubí | 1887–1956 | 1887 | 1956 | Spanish Civil War seen from Cuba |
| Camus | Albert Camus | 1913–1960 | 1913 | 1960 | Algerian-born French writer and philosopher |
| Carr | Emily Carr | 1871–1945 | 1871 | 1945 | Canadian artist |
| Carrington | Dora Carrington | 1893–1932 | 1893 | 1932 | English painter |
| Carroll | Jim Carroll | 1949–2009 | 1949 | 2009 | American author, poet and musician |
| Carroll | Lewis Carroll | 1832–1898 | 1832 | 1898 | Pseudonym of Charles L. Dodgson, English writer and mathematician |
| Casares | Adolfo Bioy Casares | 1914–1999 | 1914 | 1999 | Argentine fiction writer and collaborator with Jorge Luis Borges |
| Casey | Richard Casey | 1890–1976 | 1890 | 1976 | Baron Casey, Australian statesman and ambassador |
| Cassab | Judy Cassab | 1920–2015 | 1920 | 2015 | Australian artist |
| Castillo | Abelardo Castillo | 1935–2017 | 1935 | 2017 | Argentine novelist and essayist |
| Castle | Barbara Castle | 1910–2002 | 1910 | 2002 | English politician |
| Caughey | Catherine Caughey | 1923–2008 | 1923 | 2008 | Kenyan-born New Zealand code breaker and occupational therapist |
| Caverhill | Hannah Rebecca Frances Caverhill | 1834–1897 | 1834 | 1897 | New Zealand homemaker |
| Channon | Henry Channon | 1897–1958 | 1897 | 1958 | Anglo-American politician and author |
| Chaszczewacki | Miriam Chaszczewacki | 1924–1942 | 1924 | 1942 | Polish Jewish Holocaust victim |
| Cheever | John Cheever | 1912–1982 | 1912 | 1982 | American novelist |
| Chennault | Claire Lee Chennault | 1890–1958 | 1890 | 1958 | American World War II General, head of the Flying Tigers |
| Chesnut | Mary Boykin Chesnut | 1823–1886 | 1823 | 1886 | American who described life in South Carolina in the American Civil War |
| Choe Bu | Choe Bu | 1454–1504 | 1454 | 1504 | Korean official and traveler |
| Christie | Johan Koren Christie | 1909–1995 | 1909 | 1995 | Norwegian air-force major general |
| Ciano | Galeazzo Ciano | 1903–1944 | 1903 | 1944 | Mussolini's Italian foreign minister |
| Cibulka | Hanns Cibulka | 1920–2004 | 1920 | 2004 | German Bohemian poet |
| Cioran | Emil Cioran | 1911–1995 | 1911 | 1995 | Romanian writer and philosopher |
| Clark | Alan Clark | 1928–1999 | 1928 | 1999 | English politician and historian |
| Clark | Andrew Clark | 1856–1922 | 1856 | 1922 | Scottish diarist and cleric |
| Clark | Ossie Clark | 1942–1996 | 1942 | 1996 | English fashion designer |
| Clark | Ralph Clark | 1755–1794 | 1755 | 1794 | Scottish naval officer |
| Clifford | Lady Anne Clifford | 1590–1676 | 1590 | 1676 | English literary patron and correspondent |
| Cobain | Kurt Cobain | 1967–1994 | 1967 | 1994 | American rock musician, Nirvana’s lead singer |
| Cockburn | Henry Cockburn | 1779–1854 | 1779 | 1854 | Lord Cockburn, Scottish judge and writer |
| Cocks | Richard Cocks | 1566–1624 | 1566 | 1624 | English head of trading post in Japan |
| Cocteau | Jean Cocteau | 1889–1963 | 1889 | 1963 | French writer and filmmaker |
| Coey | John Alan Coey | 1950–1975 | 1950 | 1975 | American soldier with the Rhodesian army |
| Coke | Mary Coke | 1727–1811 | 1727 | 1811 | English diarist and correspondent |
| Cole | William Cole | 1714–1782 | 1714 | 1782 | English Anglican cleric and antiquary |
| Collis | Maurice Collis | 1889–1973 | 1889 | 1973 | Irish administrator in Burma and writer |
| Columbus | Christopher Columbus | 1451–1506 | 1451 | 1506 | Cristoforo Colombo, Italian explorer and colonizer |
| Colville | Jock Colville | 1915–1987 | 1915 | 1987 | English civil servant |
| Condict | Jemima Condict | 1754–1779 | 1754 | 1779 | American child diarist |
| Congar | Yves Congar | 1904–1995 | 1904 | 1995 | French Dominican friar and theologian |
| Coningsby | Thomas Coningsby | 1550–1625 | 1550 | 1625 | English soldier and member of parliament |
| Constant | Benjamin Constant | 1767–1830 | 1767 | 1830 | French writer, philosopher and politician |
| Cooper | Ethel Cooper | 1871–1961 | 1871 | 1961 | Australian musician and First World War German detainee |
| Coppola | Eleanor Coppola | 1936– | 1936 | | American filmmaker and writer |
| Corrie | Rachel Corrie | 1979–2003 | 1979 | 2003 | American activist |
| Cory | William Johnson Cory | 1823–1892 | 1823 | 1892 | English schoolmaster and scholar |
| Costantini | Celso Benigno Luigi Costantini | 1876–1958 | 1876 | 1958 | Vatican cardinal and Apostolic Chancellor |
| Coward | Noël Coward | 1899–1973 | 1899 | 1973 | English playwright and composer |
| Cowper | Mary Cowper | 1685–1724 | 1685 | 1724 | English courtier |
| Cox | James Cox | 1846–1925 | 1846 | 1925 | New Zealand swagman |
| Coyet | Peter Julius Coyet | 1618–1667 | 1618 | 1667 | Swedish envoy to England |
| Creevey | Thomas Creevey | 1768–1838 | 1768 | 1838 | English politician |
| Cresswell | Nicholas Cresswell | 1750–1804 | 1750 | 1804 | English settler in the American colonies |
| Cristea | Nicolae Cristea | 1834–1902 | 1834 | 1902 | Romanian priest and political activist |
| Croker | John Wilson Croker | 1780–1857 | 1780 | 1857 | Irish-born politician |
| Crompton | Susan Mary Crompton | 1846–1932 | 1846 | 1932 | Australian social welfare reformer |
| Cronman | Fritz Cronman | 1640–1680 | 1640 | 1680 | Swedish diplomat |
| Crossman | Richard Crossman | 1907–1974 | 1907 | 1974 | English politician and writer |
| Crowley | Aleister Crowley | 1875–1947 | 1875 | 1947 | English occultist and poet |
| Cullwick | Hannah Cullwick | 1833–1909 | 1833 | 1909 | English domestic servant and lodging-house keeper |
| Curie | Marie Curie | 1867–1934 | 1867 | 1934 | Polish physicist and chemist |
| Curvers | Alexis Curvers | 1906–1992 | 1906 | 1992 | Belgian writer |
| Czarkowski-Golejewski | Cyryl Czarkowski-Golejewski | 1885–1940 | 1885 | 1940 | Polish landowner and Katyn massacre victim |
| Czartoryska | Klementyna Czartoryska | 1780–1852 | 1780 | 1852 | Polish noblewoman |
| Czerniaków | Adam Czerniaków | 1880–1942 | 1880 | 1942 | Polish head of the Warsaw Ghetto’s Judenrat and Holocaust victim |
| d'Ewes | Simonds d'Ewes | 1602–1650 | 1602 | 1650 | English antiquary and politician |
| Daae | Ludvig Daae | 1829–1893 | 1829 | 1893 | Norwegian jurist and politician |
| Dabit | Eugène Dabit | 1898–1936 | 1898 | 1936 | French writer |
| Dąbrowska | Maria Dąbrowska | 1889–1965 | 1889 | 1965 | Polish novelist and playwright |
| Dacosta | Luísa Dacosta | 1927–2015 | 1927 | 2015 | Portuguese fiction writer and poet |
| Dallam | Thomas Dallam | 1575–1630 | 1575 | 1630 | English organ builder (diary 1598–1599, journey to Turkey) |
| Danckaerts | Jasper Danckaerts | 1639–1704 | 1639 | 1704 | Dutch North American colonist and travel writer |
| Đặng | Đặng Thùy Trâm | 1942–1970 | 1942 | 1970 | Vietnamese army surgeon |
| Darre | Jacob Hersleb Darre | 1757–1841 | 1757 | 1841 | Norwegian chaplain and constitutional assembly representative |
| Dati | Gregorio Dati | 1363–1435 | 1363 | 1435 | Florentine merchant |
| Davis | Emilie Davis | 1839–1889 | 1839 | 1889 | African-American diarist, fl.1860s |
| Dawbin | Anna Dawbin | 1816–1905 | 1816 | 1905 | English-born Australian housewife and foster mother |
| Day | Dorothy Day | 1897–1980 | 1897 | 1980 | American journalist and co-founder of the Catholic Worker Movement |
| de Beauvoir | Simone de Beauvoir | 1908–1986 | 1908 | 1986 | French writer and philosopher |
| de Biran | Maine de Biran | 1766–1824 | 1766 | 1824 | French writer, philosopher and mathematician |
| de Brakelond | Jocelyn de Brakelond | 1155–1202 | 1155 | 1202 | English monk |
| de Castelbajac | Constance de Castelbajac | 1859–1886 | 1859 | 1886 | French aristocrat |
| de Catt | Henri de Catt | 1725–1795 | 1725 | 1795 | Swiss scholar |
| de Clercq | Willem de Clercq | 1795–1844 | 1795 | 1844 | Dutch Protestant revivalist |
| de Ficquelmont | Dorothea de Ficquelmont | 1804–1863 | 1804 | 1863 | Russian diarist in French and salonnière |
| de Goncourt | Edmond de Goncourt | 1822–1896 | 1822 | 1896 | French writer and critic, brother of Jules |
| de Goncourt | Jules de Goncourt | 1830–1870 | 1830 | 1870 | French writer, brother of Edmond |
| de Gouberville | Gilles de Gouberville | 1521–1578 | 1521 | 1578 | French seigneur in Cotentin, Normandy |
| de Graffigny | Françoise de Graffigny | 1695–1758 | 1695 | 1758 | French novelist and salonnière |
| de Guérin | Eugénie de Guérin | 1805–1848 | 1805 | 1848 | French writer |
| de Jesus | Carolina Maria de Jesus | 1914–1977 | 1914 | 1977 | Brazilian writer and social activist |
| de L’Estoile | Pierre de L'Estoile | 1546–1611 | 1546 | 1611 | French collector |
| de Mélito | André François Miot de Mélito | 1762–1841 | 1762 | 1841 | French statesman and scholar |
| de Mofras | Eugène Duflot de Mofras | 1810–1884 | 1810 | 1884 | French naturalist and diplomat |
| de Pougy | Liane de Pougy | 1869–1950 | 1869 | 1950 | French dancer and courtesan |
| De Quincey | Thomas De Quincey | 1785–1859 | 1785 | 1859 | English man of letters |
| de Saint-Jean | Robert de Saint-Jean | 1901–1987 | 1901 | 1987 | French writer and journalist |
| de Thompson | Mariquita Sánchez de Thompson | 1786–1868 | 1786 | 1868 | Argentine society hostess |
| de Tinan | Jean de Tinan | 1874–1898 | 1874 | 1898 | French writer |
| de Veer | Gerrit de Veer | 1570–1598 | 1570 | 1598 | Dutch naval officer |
| de Vernet | María Sáez de Vernet | 1800–1858 | 1800 | 1858 | Argentine resident in the Falkland Islands |
| de Vigny | Alfred de Vigny | 1797–1863 | 1797 | 1863 | French writer |
| Debes | Jens Peter Debes | 1776–1832 | 1776 | 1832 | Norwegian judge and politician |
| Dedekam | Sophie Dedekam | 1820–1894 | 1820 | 1894 | Norwegian composer |
| Dee | John Dee | 1527–1609 | 1527 | 1609 | 17th-century English mathematician and astronomer of Welsh extraction |
| Deen | Helga Deen | 1925–1943 | 1925 | 1943 | Dutch/German Holocaust victim |
| Delacroix | Eugène Delacroix | 1798–1863 | 1798 | 1863 | French painter |
| Delafield | E. M. Delafield | 1890–1943 | 1890 | 1943 | Edmée Elizabeth Monica Dashwood, née de la Pasture. (English novelist |
| Delvaille | Bernard Delvaille | 1931–2006 | 1931 | 2006 | French poet and anthologist |
| Deșliu | Dan Deșliu | 1927–1992 | 1927 | 1992 | Romanian poet |
| Dessì | Giuseppe Dessì | 1909–1977 | 1909 | 1977 | Italian novelist and playwright |
| Diamandy | George Diamandy | 1867–1917 | 1867 | 1917 | Romanian politician and social scientist |
| Dodington | George Bubb Dodington | 1691–1762 | 1691 | 1762 | English politician and nobleman |
| Doherty | Pete Doherty | 1979– | 1979 | | English rock musician |
| Dorian | Emil Dorian | 1893–1956 | 1893 | 1956 | Romanian poet and physician |
| Dostoevsky | Fyodor Dostoevsky | 1821–1881 | 1821 | 1881 | Russian novelist |
| Dostoyevskaya | Anna Dostoyevskaya | 1846–1918 | 1846 | 1918 | Russian wife of Fyodor Dostoevsky |
| Draenger | Gusta Dawidson Draenger | 1917–1943 | 1917 | 1943 | Polish Holocaust victim |
| Drinker | Elizabeth Sandwith Drinker | 1735–1807 | 1735 | 1807 | American Quaker diarist |
| du Gard | Roger Martin du Gard | 1881–1958 | 1881 | 1958 | French writer |
| Dudeney | Alice Dudeney | 1866–1945 | 1866 | 1945 | English novelist (life in Sussex) |
| Dugdale | William Dugdale | 1605–1686 | 1605 | 1686 | English antiquary and historian |
| Duke | Antera Duke | –1788 | | 1788 | Nigerian slave trader |
| Duras | Marguerite Duras | 1914–1996 | 1914 | 1996 | French novelist and scriptwriter |
| Dylan | Bob Dylan | 1941– | 1941 | | American musician and songwriter |
| Dyott | William Dyott | 1761–1847 | 1761 | 1847 | British army General and aide-de-camp of George III |
| Eberhardt | Isabelle Eberhardt | 1877–1904 | 1877 | 1904 | Swiss explorer and writer |
| Ebner | Christina Ebner | 1277–1356 | 1277 | 1356 | German Dominican mystic |
| Ebner | Margareta Ebner | 1291–1351 | 1291 | 1351 | German Dominican nun |
| Edwards | Dickon Edwards | 1971– | 1971 | | British musician and dandy |
| Elet | Jacob Elet | | | | Dutch factor on the Slave Coast of West Africa, early 18th century |
| Eliade | Mircea Eliade | 1907–1986 | 1907 | 1986 | Romanian historian of religion and mythologist |
| Eliot | George Eliot | 1819–1880 | 1819 | 1880 | Pseudonym of Mary Anne Evans, English novelist |
| Ellis | Edward Robb Ellis | 1911–1998 | 1911 | 1998 | American writer and reporter |
| Emerson | Ralph Waldo Emerson | 1803–1882 | 1803 | 1882 | American writer |
| Engel-Wijnberg | Selma Engel-Wijnberg | 1922–2018 | 1922 | 2018 | Dutch Holocaust survivor |
| Eno | Brian Eno | 1948– | 1948 | | English musician, record producer and polymath |
| Ernaux | Annie Ernaux | 1940– | 1940 | | French writer |
| Evelyn | John Evelyn | 1620–1706 | 1620 | 1706 | English writer, scholar and gardener |
| Faithfull | Marianne Faithfull | 1946– | 1946 | | English singer and actress |
| Farington | Joseph Farington | 1747–1821 | 1747 | 1821 | English landscape painter |
| Farmborough | Florence Farmborough | 1887–1978 | 1887 | 1978 | English nurse and author |
| Fawkner | John Pascoe Fawkner | 1792–1869 | 1792 | 1869 | Australian pioneer and politician |
| Fay | Eliza Fay | 1756–1816 | 1756 | 1816 | English traveller to India |
| Fenyő | Miksa Fenyő | 1877–1972 | 1877 | 1972 | Hungarian politician and poet |
| Fesch | Jacques Fesch | 1930–1957 | 1930 | 1957 | French murderer and Catholic convert |
| Fiennes | Celia Fiennes | 1652–1741 | 1652 | 1741 | English traveler |
| Filipović | Zlata Filipović | 1980– | 1980 | | Bosnian child and adult diarist in Sarajevo |
| Fisher | Carrie Fisher | 1956–2016 | 1956 | 2016 | American actress and writer |
| Fitzgerald | F. Scott Fitzgerald | 1896–1940 | 1896 | 1940 | American writer |
| Fjellbu | Arne Fjellbu | 1890–1962 | 1890 | 1962 | Norwegian bishop |
| Fleming | Marjorie Fleming | 1803–1811 | 1803 | 1811 | Scottish child diarist (diary 1809–1811) |
| Fountaine | Margaret Fountaine | 1862–1940 | 1862 | 1940 | Lepidopterist |
| Fox | Caroline Fox | 1819–1871 | 1819 | 1871 | English socialite, sister of Barclay |
| Fox | George Fox | 1624–1691 | 1624 | 1691 | English founder of the Quakers |
| Foxe | Samuel Foxe | 1560–1630 | 1560 | 1630 | English politician |
| Frank | Anne Frank | 1929–1945 | 1929 | 1945 | Dutch Holocaust victim, documenting her life in hiding (1941–1945) |
| Franklin | Miles Franklin | 1879–1954 | 1879 | 1954 | Australian author |
| Fremantle | Elizabeth Wynne Fremantle | 1789–1857 | 1789 | 1857 | English wife of Thomas Fremantle, main contributor to The Wynne Diaries |
| Friend | Donald Friend | 1915–1989 | 1915 | 1989 | Australian artist |
| Fripp | Robert Fripp | 1946– | 1946 | | English musician |
| Frisch | Max Frisch | 1911–1991 | 1911 | 1991 | Swiss playwright and novelist |
| Fritz | Samuel Fritz | 1654–1730 | 1654 | 1730 | Czech Jesuit missionary and explorer |
| Fromm | Bella Fromm | 1890–1972 | 1890 | 1972 | German wartime diarist and journalist |
| Fujiwara no Kanezane | Fujiwara no Kanezane | 1149–1207 | 1149 | 1207 | Japanese historian and Chief Minister |
| Fujiwara no Michinaga | Fujiwara no Michinaga | 966–1028 | 966 | 1028 | Japanese poet and statesman |
| Fujiwara no Sanesuke | Fujiwara no Sanesuke | 957–1046 | 957 | 1046 | Japanese Minister of the Right |
| Fujiwara no Teika | Fujiwara no Teika | 1162–1241 | 1162 | 1241 | Japanese scholar and calligrapher |
| Fuller | Buckminster Fuller | 1895–1993 | 1895 | 1993 | Richard Buckminster Fuller Jr., American designer and engineer |
| Fulton | Catherine Fulton | 1829–1919 | 1829 | 1919 | New Zealand community leader and suffragette |
| Furttenbach | Joseph Furttenbach | 1591–1667 | 1591 | 1667 | German architect and mathematician |
| Gág | Wanda Gág | 1893–1946 | 1893 | 1946 | American artist and children's author |
| Gaitskell | Hugh Gaitskell | 1906–1963 | 1906 | 1963 | English politician |
| Garborg | Arne Garborg | 1851–1924 | 1851 | 1924 | Norwegian writer |
| Gascoyne | David Gascoyne | 1916–2001 | 1916 | 2001 | English poet and translator |
| Gelfand | Vladimir Gelfand | 1923–1983 | 1923 | 1983 | Soviet World War II soldier |
| Gertsyk | Eugenia Gertsyk | 1878–1944 | 1878 | 1944 | Russian/Soviet writer and translator |
| Gibbon | Edward Gibbon | 1737–1794 | 1737 | 1794 | English historian and politician |
| Gide | André Gide | 1869–1951 | 1869 | 1951 | French novelist and man of letters |
| Gillette | Chester Gillette | 1883–1908 | 1883 | 1908 | American murderer |
| Ginsberg | Allen Ginsberg | 1926–1997 | 1926 | 1997 | American beat poet |
| Ginz | Petr Ginz | 1928–1944 | 1928 | 1944 | Czechoslovak author, artist, editor, and Holocaust victim |
| Gjerdrum | Carl Ferdinand Gjerdrum | 1821–1902 | 1821 | 1902 | Norwegian jurist and businessman |
| Gladstone | Mary Gladstone | 1847–1927 | 1847 | 1927 | English political diarist |
| Glückel of Hameln | Glückel of Hameln | 1647–1727 | 1647 | 1727 | German businesswoman and diarist in Yiddish |
| Go-Nara | Emperor Go-Nara | 1495–1557 | 1495 | 1557 | Japanese Emperor |
| Goebbels | Joseph Goebbels | 1897–1945 | 1897 | 1945 | Nazi German Propaganda Minister |
| Goma | Paul Goma | 1935–2020 | 1935 | 2020 | Romanian dissident writer |
| Gombrowicz | Witold Gombrowicz | 1904–1969 | 1904 | 1969 | Polish writer |
| Gradowski | Zalman Gradowski | 1910–1944 | 1910 | 1944 | Polish Jewish Holocaust victim |
| Grant | Elizabeth Grant | 1797–1885 | 1797 | 1885 | Scottish traveler and writer |
| Grant | Richard E. Grant | 1957– | 1957 | | Swazi/English actor |
| Gray | Francine du Plessix Gray | 1930– | 1930 | | Franco-American author |
| Green | Julien Green | 1900–1998 | 1900 | 1998 | American author, writing in French |
| Greene | Bob Greene | 1947– | 1947 | | American journalist |
| Gregory | Augusta, Lady Gregory | 1852–1932 | 1852 | 1932 | Irish dramatist and theatre manager |
| Grenfell | Joyce Grenfell | 1910–1979 | 1910 | 1979 | English actress and writer |
| Gretton | H. W. Gretton | 1914–1983 | 1914 | 1983 | New Zealand poet, teacher and soldier |
| Greville | Charles Greville | 1794–1865 | 1794 | 1865 | English civil servant and cricketer |
| Grimké | Charlotte Forten Grimké | 1837–1914 | 1837 | 1914 | American abolitionist and women's rights activist |
| Grote | Harriet Grote | 1792–1878 | 1792 | 1878 | English salonnière and biographer |
| Groult | Benoîte Groult | 1920–2016 | 1920 | 2016 | French writer |
| Guevara | Che Guevara | 1928–1967 | 1928 | 1967 | Argentine revolutionary |
| Guibert | Hervé Guibert | 1955–1991 | 1955 | 1991 | French writer and AIDS activist |
| Guinness | Alec Guinness | 1914–2000 | 1914 | 2000 | English actor |
| Guyotat | Pierre Guyotat | 1940– | 1940 | | French writer |
| Hagendorf | Peter Hagendorf | 1601–1679 | 1601 | 1679 | German mercenary in the Thirty Years' War |
| Haldeman | Harry Robbins Haldeman | 1926–1993 | 1926 | 1993 | American political aide involved in Watergate |
| Halder | Franz Halder | 1884–1972 | 1884 | 1972 | German army general |
| Hall | Peter Hall | 1930–2017 | 1930 | 2017 | English theater and film director |
| Hammarskjöld | Dag Hammarskjöld | 1905–1961 | 1905 | 1961 | Swedish Secretary-General of the United Nations |
| Hammond | Richard Hammond | 1969– | 1969 | | English TV presenter |
| Hanazono | Emperor Hanazono | 1297–1348 | 1297 | 1348 | Japanese Emperor |
| Hansjakob | Heinrich Hansjakob | 1837–1916 | 1837 | 1916 | German Catholic priest, historian and novelist |
| Hara Takashi | Hara Takashi | 1856–1921 | 1856 | 1921 | Japanese Prime Minister |
| Hardy | Mary Hardy | 1733–1809 | 1733 | 1809 | English farmer and brewer's wife from Whissonsett, Norfolk |
| Haring | Keith Haring | 1958–1990 | 1958 | 1990 | American artist |
| Harmaja | Saima Harmaja | 1913–1937 | 1913 | 1937 | Finnish poet and tuberculosis victim |
| Harris | Howell Harris | 1714–1773 | 1714 | 1773 | Welsh preacher |
| Harris and Klebold | Eric Harris and Dylan Klebold | 1981–1999 | 1981 | 1999 | American schoolboy perpetrators of the Columbine High School massacre |
| Harrison | Sabrina Ward Harrison | 1975– | 1975 | | Canadian artist and author |
| Hasenbosch | Leendert Hasenbosch | 1695–1724 | 1695 | 1724 | Castaway Dutch sailor |
| Hauge | Olav H. Hauge | 1908–1994 | 1908 | 1994 | Norwegian horticulturalist and poet |
| Haugland | Jens Haugland | 1910–1991 | 1910 | 1991 | Norwegian jurist and politician |
| Havet | Mireille Havet | 1898–1932 | 1898 | 1932 | French writer |
| Hawker | Peter Hawker | 1786–1853 | 1786 | 1853 | English army officer and sportsman |
| Hayden | Mary Hayden | 1862–1942 | 1862 | 1942 | Irish historian |
| Haydon | Benjamin Haydon | 1786–1846 | 1786 | 1846 | English painter |
| Hayes | Rutherford B. Hayes | 1822–1893 | 1822 | 1893 | 19th President of the United States |
| Henslowe | Philip Henslowe | 1550–1615 | 1550 | 1615 | English theatre producer |
| Herbert | Dorothea Herbert | 1767–1829 | 1767 | 1829 | Irish poet |
| Herzberg | Abel Herzberg | 1893–1989 | 1893 | 1989 | Dutch lawyer and writer |
| Heyde | Maria Heyde | 1837–1913 | 1837 | 1913 | German missionary and translator in Tibet |
| Highsmith | Patricia Highsmith | 1923–1995 | 1923 | 1995 | American author |
| Hillesum | Etty Hillesum | 1914–1943 | 1914 | 1943 | Dutch Holocaust victim. |
| Hilton | George Hilton | 1673–1725 | 1673 | 1725 | English gentleman diarist[2] |
| Himmler | Heinrich Himmler | 1900–1945 | 1900 | 1945 | Nazi and commander of the SS[3] |
| Hinde | Edmund C. Hinde | 1830–1909 | 1830 | 1909 | American participant in the 1850s California Gold Rush |
| Hinel | Anna Maria Hinel | 1924–1943 | 1924 | 1943 | Polish underground activist and Holocaust victim |
| Hitchcock | Henry Hitchcock (Missouri lawyer) | 1829–1902 | 1829 | 1902 | American lawyer serving under General William Tecumseh Sherman |
| Hoare | Louisa Gurney Hoare | 1784–1836 | 1784 | 1836 | English writer on education |
| Hoare | Richard Hoare | 1758–1838 | 1758 | 1838 | Second baronet Hoare, English antiquary and traveler |
| Hobhouse | John Hobhouse | 1786–1869 | 1786 | 1869 | English politician and Member of Parliament |
| Hoby | Lady Margaret Hoby | 1571–1633 | 1571 | 1633 | English gentlewoman |
| Holden | Edith Holden | 1871–1920 | 1871 | 1920 | English artist, teacher and naturalist |
| Holland | William Holland | 1746–1818 | 1746 | 1818 | English country clergyman |
| Holstein-Gottorp | Hedvig Elisabeth Charlotte of Holstein-Gottorp | 1759–1818 | 1759 | 1818 | Queen of Sweden and Norway |
| Hone | Philip Hone | 1780–1851 | 1780 | 1851 | American mayor and New York socialite |
| Hopkins | Gerard Manley Hopkins | 1844–1889 | 1844 | 1889 | English poet and priest |
| Horney | Karen Horney | 1885–1952 | 1885 | 1952 | German psychoanalyst |
| Howard | Lyall Howard | 1896–1955 | 1896 | 1955 | Australian engineer and businessman |
| Imam | Jahanara Imam | 1929–1994 | 1929 | 1994 | Bangladeshi writer and political activist |
| Inge | William Ralph Inge | 1860–1954 | 1860 | 1954 | English cleric and author |
| Inglis | Julia, Lady Inglis | 1833–1904 | 1833 | 1904 | English diarist with an account of the 1857 Siege of Lucknow |
| Inman | Arthur Crew Inman | 1895–1963 | 1895 | 1963 | American poet who wrote a diary of 17 million words |
| Isherwood | Christopher Isherwood | 1904–1986 | 1904 | 1986 | English-American novelist |
| Ishin Sūden | Ishin Sūden | 1569–1633 | 1569 | 1633 | 1569–1633), Japanese Zen Rinzai monk and advisor |
| Iwaszkiewicz | Jarosław Iwaszkiewicz | 1894–1980 | 1894 | 1980 | Polish writer, poet and dramatist |
| Izumi Shikibu | Izumi Shikibu | 976– | 976 | | Japanese poet |
| Jacob | Rosamond Jacob | 1888–1960 | 1888 | 1960 | Irish writer |
| Jacob | Violet Jacob | 1863–1946 | 1863 | 1946 | Scottish novelist and poet |
| James | Alice James | 1848–1892 | 1848 | 1892 | American sister of novelist Henry and philosopher William |
| Jarman | Derek Jarman | 1942–1994 | 1942 | 1994 | English painter, filmmaker and gardener |
| Jenkins | Joseph Jenkins | 1818–1898 | 1818 | 1898 | Welsh-born Australian swagman and self-educator |
| Jenkins | Roy Jenkins | 1920–2003 | 1920 | 2003 | Welsh-born British politician and biographer |
| Jespersen | Finn Varde Jespersen | 1914–1944 | 1914 | 1944 | Norwegian orienteer and air force lieutenant |
| Jones | John Beauchamp Jones | 1810–1866 | 1810 | 1866 | American novelist and Confederate War Department clerk |
| Jones | Liz Jones | 1958– | 1958 | | English writer and journalist |
| Josselin | Ralph Josselin | 1617–1683 | 1617 | 1683 | Rural English cleric (diary 1641–1683) |
| Jouhandeau | Marcel Jouhandeau | 1888–1979 | 1888 | 1979 | French writer |
| Joyce | Stanislaus Joyce | 1884–1955 | 1884 | 1955 | Irish scholar and writer |
| Jun Takami | Jun Takami | 1907–1965 | 1907 | 1965 | 1907–1965), Japanese novelist and poet |
| Jünger | Ernst Jünger | 1895–1998 | 1895 | 1998 | German entomologist and Wehrmacht officer |
| Kafka | Franz Kafka | 1883–1924 | 1883 | 1924 | German-language Jewish Czech novelist |
| Kafū Nagai | Kafū Nagai | 1879–1959 | 1879 | 1959 | 1879–1959), Japanese author and playwright |
| Kahlo | Frida Kahlo | 1907–1954 | 1907 | 1954 | Mexican painter |
| Kajūji Mitsutoyo | Kajūji Mitsutoyo | 1576–1612 | 1576 | 1612 | 1576–1612), Japanese noble |
| Kálli | Leszli Kálli | | | | Colombian kidnap victim |
| Kamal | Sufia Kamal | 1911–1999 | 1911 | 1999 | Bangladeshi writer and political activist |
| Karpiński | Wojciech Karpiński | 1943– | 1943 | | Polish critic and historian of ideas |
| Kästner | Erich Kästner | 1899–1974 | 1899 | 1974 | German satirist and children's writer |
| Kazin | Alfred Kazin | 1915–1988 | 1915 | 1988 | American writer and critic |
| Kelekar | Ravindra Kelekar | 1925–2010 | 1925 | 2010 | Indian activist and writer |
| Kellner | Friedrich Kellner | 1885–1970 | 1885 | 1970 | German justice inspector and author |
| Kemble | Fanny Kemble | 1809–1893 | 1809 | 1893 | English actress |
| Kessler | Harry Graf Kessler | 1868–1937 | 1868 | 1937 | Anglo-German diplomat and writer |
| Kierkegaard | Søren Kierkegaard | 1813–1855 | 1813 | 1855 | Danish philosopher and theologian |
| Kilvert | Francis Kilvert | 1840–1879 | 1840 | 1879 | English country cleric |
| Kimura Kenkadō | Kimura Kenkadō | 1736–1802 | 1736 | 1802 | 1736–1802), Japanese scholar and artist |
| King | Cecil Harmsworth King | 1901–1987 | 1901 | 1987 | English newspaper proprietor |
| King | William Lyon Mackenzie King | 1874–1950 | 1874 | 1950 | Canadian Prime Minister |
| Kirstein | Lincoln Kirstein | 1907–1996 | 1907 | 1996 | American writer, impresario and connoisseur |
| Klee | Paul Klee | 1879–1940 | 1879 | 1940 | Swiss-German painter |
| Klemperer | Victor Klemperer | 1881–1960 | 1881 | 1960 | German scholar and writer |
| Klepper | Jochen Klepper | 1903–1942 | 1903 | 1942 | German writer and poet |
| Knopwood | Robert Knopwood | 1763–1938 | 1763 | 1938 | English-born Australian clergyman |
| Kobayashi Issa | Kobayashi Issa | 1763–1828 | 1763 | 1828 | Japanese Jōdo Shinshū lay priest |
| Kohnová | Věra Kohnová | 1929–1942 | 1929 | 1942 | Czechoslovak Holocaust victim |
| Kōichi Kido | Kōichi Kido | 1889–1977 | 1889 | 1977 | 1889–1977), Japanese imperial advisor |
| Koker | David Koker | 1921–1945 | 1921 | 1945 | Dutch Holocaust victim |
| Koller | Karl Koller | 1898–1951 | 1898 | 1951 | German air force general |
| Kollwitz | Käthe Kollwitz | 1867–1945 | 1867 | 1945 | German artist |
| Konoe Nobutada | Konoe Nobutada | 1565–1614 | 1565 | 1614 | Japanese courtier and poet |
| Konstantinova | Ina Konstantinova | 1924–1944 | 1924 | 1944 | Soviet World War II partisan |
| Koren | Christiane Koren | 1764–1815 | 1764 | 1815 | Danish-born Norwegian poet and playwright |
| Kowalska | Faustina Kowalska | 1905–1938 | 1905 | 1938 | Polish mystic, saint and secretary of Divine Mercy |
| Krajewska | Teodora Krajewska | 1854–1935 | 1854 | 1935 | Polish-born Austro-Hungarian physician and writer |
| Kraus | Marianne Kraus | 1765–1838 | 1765 | 1838 | German painter and travel writer |
| Kunikida | Doppo Kunikida | 1871–1908 | 1871 | 1908 | Japanese novelist and poet |
| Kuzmin | Mikhail Kuzmin | 1872–1936 | 1872 | 1936 | Russian writer |
| L’Engle | Madeleine L’Engle | 1918–2007 | 1918 | 2007 | American author |
| Lagerlöf | Selma Lagerlöf | 1858–1940 | 1858 | 1940 | Swedish writer, first female winner of Nobel Prize for Literature |
| Landucci | Luca Landucci | 1436–1516 | 1436 | 1516 | Florentine Italian apothecary |
| Langford | Gladys Langford | 1890–1972 | 1890 | 1972 | London wartime schoolteacher |
| Larbaud | Valery Larbaud | 1881–1957 | 1881 | 1957 | French author |
| Lascelles | Alan Lascelles | 1887–1881 | 1887 | 1881 | English royal courtier and civil servant |
| Laskier | Rutka Laskier | 1929–1943 | 1929 | 1943 | Polish Holocaust chronicler |
| Last | Nella Last | 1889–1968 | 1889 | 1968 | English housewife |
| Latham | Mark Latham | 1961– | 1961 | | Australian Labor Party politician |
| Laukhard | Friedrich Christian Laukhard | 1757–1822 | 1757 | 1822 | German novelist and theologian |
| Leadbeater | Mary Leadbeater | 1758–1826 | 1758 | 1826 | Irish writer |
| Léautaud | Paul Léautaud | 1872–1956 | 1872 | 1956 | French writer and author of Le Journal Littéraire |
| Lechoń | Jan Lechoń | 1899–1956 | 1899 | 1956 | Polish critic and diplomat |
| Lees-Milne | James Lees-Milne | 1908–1997 | 1908 | 1997 | English biographer, historian and secretary of National Trust Country House Committee |
| Leseur | Élisabeth Leseur | 1866–1914 | 1866 | 1914 | French mystic |
| Lestrade | Didier Lestrade | 1958– | 1958 | | French author and AIDS activist |
| Lewis | C. S. Lewis | 1898–1963 | 1898 | 1963 | Irish-born English children's writer and theologian |
| Lewis | Norman Lewis | 1908–2003 | 1908 | 2003 | English journalist and travel writer |
| Lindbergh | Anne Morrow Lindbergh | 1906–2001 | 1906 | 2001 | American wife of aviator, who described the kidnapping of their child |
| Lipszyc | Rywka Lipszyc | 1929–1945 | 1929 | 1945 | Polish Jewish Holocaust victim |
| Lister | Anne Lister | 1791–1840 | 1791 | 1840 | English landowner, diarist and lesbian |
| Lockhart | R. H. Bruce Lockhart | 1887–1970 | 1887 | 1970 | English secret agent and author |
| Louÿs | Pierre Louÿs | 1870–1925 | 1870 | 1925 | French writer |
| Love | Courtney Love | 1964– | 1964 | | American actress and rock musician |
| Lowndes | Marie Belloc Lowndes | 1868–1947 | 1868 | 1947 | French-born English novelist and playwright, sister of Hilaire Belloc |
| Lugovskaya | Nina Lugovskaya | 1918–1993 | 1918 | 1993 | Soviet Russian artist (diary 1928–1937) |
| Luttrell | Narcissus Luttrell | 1657–1732 | 1657 | 1732 | English historian and politician |
| Mac Amhlaigh | Dónall Mac Amhlaigh | 1926–1989 | 1926 | 1989 | Irish writer |
| Macarthur | Elizabeth Macarthur | 1766–1850 | 1766 | 1850 | English-born Australian pastoralist and merchant |
| Machyn | Henry Machyn | 1496–1563 | 1496 | 1563 | English clothier |
| Maclean | Alasdair Maclean | 1926–1994 | 1926 | 1994 | Scottish poet |
| Macmillan | Harold Macmillan | 1894–1986 | 1894 | 1986 | UK Prime Minister |
| Macnaughtan | Sarah Broom Macnaughtan | 1864–1916 | 1864 | 1916 | Scottish-born novelist and wartime social volunteer |
| Macready | William Macready | 1793–1873 | 1793 | 1873 | English actor |
| Maeterlinck | Maurice Maeterlinck | 1862–1949 | 1862 | 1949 | Belgian writer |
| Mahler-Werfel | Alma Mahler-Werfel | 1879–1964 | 1879 | 1964 | German musician, wife of Gustav Mahler |
| Malik | Charles Malik | 1906–1987 | 1906 | 1987 | Lebanese philosopher and diplomat |
| Malina | Judith Malina | 1926–2015 | 1926 | 2015 | German-born American actress and co-founder of Living Theatre |
| Manet | Julie Manet | 1878–1966 | 1878 | 1966 | French painter and art collector |
| Manley | Edna Manley | 1900–1987 | 1900 | 1987 | Jamaican sculptor and painter |
| Mann | Klaus Mann | 1906–1949 | 1906 | 1949 | German-born American writer |
| Mann | Thomas Mann | 1875–1955 | 1875 | 1955 | German novelist, Nobel Prize for Literature |
| Manningham | John Manningham | –1622 | | 1622 | English lawyer |
| Manoliu | Petru Manoliu | 1903–1976 | 1903 | 1976 | Romanian novelist and newspaper editor |
| Mansfield | Katherine Mansfield | 1888–1923 | 1888 | 1923 | New Zealand modernist fiction writer |
| Marais | Mathieu Marais | 1665–1737 | 1665 | 1737 | French jurist |
| Marie of Romania | Marie of Romania | 1875–1938 | 1875 | 1938 | English-born Romanian queen consort |
| Marienescu | Atanasie Marian Marienescu | 1830–1915 | 1830 | 1915 | Austro-Hungarian-born Romanian folklorist |
| Martin | Joachim Martin | 1842–1897 | 1842 | 1897 | French carpenter |
| Massalska | Helena Apolonia Massalska | 1763–1815 | 1763 | 1815 | Polish noblewoman |
| Mathew | Mary Mathew | 1724–1777 | 1724 | 1777 | Irish householder |
| Mathew | Sarah Mathew | 1805–1890 | 1805 | 1890 | New Zealand housewife |
| Matome Ugaki | Matome Ugaki | 890–1945 | 890 | 1945 | 1890–1945), Japanese admiral |
| Matsudair Ietada | Matsudaira Ietada (Fukōzu) | 1555–1600 | 1555 | 1600 | Japanese samurai |
| Matsuo Bashō | Matsuo Bashō | 1644–1694 | 1644 | 1694 | Japanese haiku and renga poet |
| Matthew | Christopher Matthew | 1939– | 1939 | | English writer and broadcaster |
| McCafferty | Megan McCafferty | 1973– | 1973 | | American YA author |
| McCrae | Georgiana McCrae | 1804–1890 | 1804 | 1890 | English-born Australian painter |
| McNaughton | Kit McNaughton | 1887–1953 | 1887 | 1953 | Australian wartime nurse |
| Mehta | Durgaram Mehta | 1809–1876 | 1809 | 1876 | Indian Gujarati reformer and essayist |
| Mencken | H. L. Mencken | 1880–1956 | 1880 | 1956 | American essayist and scholar |
| Merton | Thomas Merton | 1915–1968 | 1915 | 1968 | Trappist monk and writer |
| Miaskowski | Wojciech Miaskowski | –1654 | | 1654 | Polish nobleman and Sejm member |
| Michihiko Hachiya | Michihiko Hachiya | 1903–1980 | 1903 | 1980 | Japanese medical practitioner and Hiroshima survivor |
| Michitsuna no Haha | Michitsuna no Haha | 935–995 | 935 | 995 | Japanese writer |
| Mihaly | Jo Mihaly | 1902–1989 | 1902 | 1989 | German dancer and writer |
| Milburn | Clara Milburn | 1883–1961 | 1883 | 1961 | Wartime (WWII) English housewife |
| Miles | Hallie Eustace Miles | 1868–1955 | 1868 | 1955 | English writer, restaurateur, and activist |
| Minamoto no Michichika | Minamoto no Michichika | 1149–1202 | 1149 | 1202 | Japanese statesman |
| Minet | Pierre Minet | 1909–1975 | 1909 | 1975 | French writer |
| Mitchison | Naomi Mitchison | 1897–1999 | 1897 | 1999 | Scottish novelist and poet |
| Moen | Petter Moen | 1901–1944 | 1901 | 1944 | Norwegian resistance fighter |
| Moore | George Fletcher Moore | 1798–1886 | 1798 | 1886 | Irish-born Australian settler, explorer and linguist |
| Morissette | Alanis Morissette | 1974– | 1974 | | Canadian singer and songwriter |
| Morley | Helena Morley | 1880–1970 | 1880 | 1970 | Brazilian young-adult writer |
| Morrice | Roger Morrice | 1628–1702 | 1628 | 1702 | English Puritan minister and political commentator |
| Morris | Mary Morris | 1921–1997 | 1921 | 1997 | Irish wartime nurse |
| Moscheles | Ignaz Moscheles | 1794–1870 | 1794 | 1870 | Bohemian composer and pianist |
| Mouchotte | René Mouchotte | 1914–1943 | 1914 | 1943 | French air force pilot |
| Mountbatten | Louis Mountbatten, 1st Earl Mountbatten of Burma | 1900–1979 | 1900 | 1979 | 1st Earl Mountbatten of Burma (1900–1979), UK naval officer and statesman |
| Mowle | Mary Braidwood Mowle | 1827–1857 | 1827 | 1857 | English-born Australian settler |
| Mrożek | Sławomir Mrożek | 1930–2013 | 1930 | 2013 | Polish dramatist and cartoonist |
| Muggeridge | Malcolm Muggeridge | 1903–1990 | 1903 | 1990 | English journalist and satirist |
| Mukhina | Lena Mukhina | 1924–1991 | 1924 | 1991 | Soviet teenager during Siege of Leningrad |
| Mullin | Chris Mullin | 1947– | 1947 | | English Labour politician and writer |
| Munby | Arthur Munby | 1828–1910 | 1828 | 1910 | English poet, barrister, and solicitor |
| Murasaki Shikibu | Murasaki Shikibu | 973–1031 | 973 | 1031 | Japanese novelist and lady in waiting |
| Murdoch | Iris Murdoch | 1919–1999 | 1919 | 1999 | Anglo-Irish novelist |
| Murgescu | Costin Murgescu | 1919–1989 | 1919 | 1989 | Romanian economist and diplomat |
| Musil | Robert Musil | 1880–1942 | 1880 | 1942 | Austrian novelist and philosopher |
| Nabe | Marc-Édouard Nabe | 1958– | 1958 | | French writer, painter and guitarist |
| Nakayama Tadachika | Nakayama Tadachika | 1131–1195 | 1131 | 1195 | 1131–1195), Japanese court noble and writer |
| Nałkowska | Zofia Nałkowska | 1884–1954 | 1884 | 1954 | Polish writer and dramatist |
| Nansen | Odd Nansen | 1901–1973 | 1901 | 1973 | Norwegian architect and humanitarian |
| Nicks | Stevie Nicks | 1948– | 1948 | | American singer/songwriter, member of Fleetwood Mac |
| Nicolson | Harold Nicolson | 1886–1968 | 1886 | 1968 | English diplomat, politician and author |
| Nijinska | Bronislava Nijinska | 1891–1972 | 1891 | 1972 | Polish/Russian ballet dance |
| Nijinsky | Vaslav Nijinsky | 1890–1950 | 1890 | 1950 | Russian ballet dancer and choreographer |
| Nijō | Lady Nijō | 1258–1307 | 1258 | 1307 | Japanese noblewoman |
| Nin | Anaïs Nin | 1903–1977 | 1903 | 1977 | Cuban/French lover of Henry Miller, writer of erotica, pornography and poetry |
| Nolens | Leonard Nolens | 1947– | 1947 | | Belgian poet |
| Nordahl | Konrad Nordahl | 1897–1975 | 1897 | 1975 | Norwegian trade unionist and politician |
| Ó Mealláin | Tarlach Ó Mealláin | | | | Irish Franciscan friar, fl.1641–1650 |
| Ó Súilleabháin | Amhlaoibh Ó Súilleabháin | 1780–1837 | 1780 | 1837 | Irish draper and teacher |
| O’Brien | Florence Vere O'Brien | 1854–1936 | 1854 | 1936 | English-born Irish philanthropist and craftwoman |
| O’Crohan | Tomas O'Crohan | 1856–1937 | 1856 | 1937 | Irish islander |
| Oates | Joyce Carol Oates | 1938– | 1938 | | American author |
| Obisesan | Akinpelu Obisesan | 1889–1963 | 1889 | 1963 | Nigerian businessman and politician |
| Odoyevtseva | Irina Odoyevtseva | 1895–1990 | 1895 | 1990 | Russian/Soviet poet and novelist |
| Oglander | John Oglander | 1585–1655 | 1585 | 1655 | English politician |
| Olsen | John Olsen | 1945– | 1945 | | Australian artist |
| Oltmans | Willem Oltmans | 1925–2004 | 1925 | 2004 | Dutch journalist |
| Ōoka Tadasuke | Ōoka Tadasuke | 1677–1762 | 1677 | 1762 | 1677–1762), Japanese samurai |
| Ording | Arne Ording | 1898–1967 | 1898 | 1967 | Norwegian historian and politician |
| Origo | Iris Origo | 1902–1988 | 1902 | 1988 | English-born biographer |
| Orton | Joe Orton | 1933–1967 | 1933 | 1967 | English playwright |
| Orwell | George Orwell | 1903–1950 | 1903 | 1950 | English journalist, essayist and critic |
| Østvedt | Einar Østvedt | 1903–1980 | 1903 | 1980 | Norwegian historian and educator |
| Ozick | Cynthia Ozick | 1928– | 1928 | | American author |
| Paget | Walburga, Lady Paget | 1839–1929 | 1839 | 1929 | German writer and friend of Queen Victoria |
| Pakenham | Frank Pakenham, 7th Earl of Longford | 1905–2001 | 1905 | 2001 | English politician and reformer |
| Palin | Michael Palin | 1943– | 1943 | | English Monty Python team member, actor and travel writer |
| Parker | Jim Parker | 1897–1980 | 1897 | 1980 | New Zealand sportsman and business executive |
| Partridge | Frances Partridge | 1900–2004 | 1900 | 2004 | English writer |
| Patton | George S. Patton | 1885–1945 | 1885 | 1945 | American World War II general |
| Pausch | Georg Pausch | 1740–1796 | 1740 | 1796 | German soldier in British service |
| Pavels | Claus Pavels | 1769–1822 | 1769 | 1822 | Norwegian bishop |
| Pavese | Cesare Pavese | 1908–1950 | 1908 | 1950 | Italian poet, novelist and critic |
| Payne | John Otunba Payne | 1839–1906 | 1839 | 1906 | Nigerian court registrar |
| Peacock | Nicholas Peacock | | | | Irish farmer, fl. mid–18th century |
| Peale | Charles Willson Peale | 1741–1827 | 1741 | 1827 | Colonial American painter |
| Pearson | Drew Pearson | 1897–1969 | 1897 | 1969 | American journalist and broadcaster |
| Pelli | Giuseppe Bencivenni Pelli | 1729–1808 | 1729 | 1808 | Italian civil servant and essayist |
| Pepys | Elizabeth Pepys | 1640–1669 | 1640 | 1669 | French-born wife of Samuel Pepys |
| Pepys | Emily Pepys | 1833–1877 | 1833 | 1877 | English child diarist (diary 1844–1845) |
| Pepys | Samuel Pepys | 1633–1703 | 1633 | 1703 | English civil servant (diary 1660–1669) |
| Percy | Elizabeth Percy, Duchess of Northumberland | 1716–1776 | 1716 | 1776 | English peeress |
| Perechodnik | Calel Perechodnik | 1916–1944 | 1916 | 1944 | Polish Jewish ghetto policeman and Holocaust victim |
| Pernet | Diane Pernet | | | | Paris-based American fashion critic |
| Peter | Frances Dallam Peter | 1843–1864 | 1843 | 1864 | United States Civil War diarist |
| Petkevičaitė-Bitė | Gabrielė Petkevičaitė-Bitė | 1861–1943 | 1861 | 1943 | Lithuanian fiction writer |
| Pickard | Tom Pickard | 1946– | 1946 | | English poet and filmmaker |
| Piglia | Ricardo Piglia | 1941–2017 | 1941 | 2017 | Argentine critic and novelist |
| Pilkington | Karl Pilkington | | | | English radio and TV personality |
| Pillai | Ananda Ranga Pillai | 1709–1761 | 1709 | 1761 | Indian dubash of French India |
| Pizarnik | Alejandra Pizarnik | 1936–1972 | 1936 | 1972 | Argentine poet |
| Pla | Josep Pla | 1897–1981 | 1897 | 1981 | Catalan writer |
| Plath | Sylvia Plath | 1932–1963 | 1932 | 1963 | American poet |
| Platter | Thomas Platter the Younger | 1574–1628 | 1574 | 1628 | Swiss-born physician and traveller |
| Polidori | John William Polidori | 1795–1821 | 1795 | 1821 | English poet, writer and physician |
| Polk | James K. Polk | 1795–1849 | 1795 | 1849 | 11th President of the United States |
| Popa | Grigore T. Popa | 1892–1948 | 1892 | 1948 | Romanian physician and intellectual |
| Porter | Agnes Porter | 1752–1814 | 1752 | 1814 | English governess |
| Pottekkatt | S. K. Pottekkatt | 1913–1982 | 1913 | 1982 | Indian writer and politician |
| Potter | Beatrix Potter | 1866–1943 | 1866 | 1943 | English children's book writer and illustrator |
| Powell | Anthony Powell | 1905–2000 | 1905 | 2000 | English novelist and biographer |
| Powell | Dawn Powell | 1896–1965 | 1896 | 1965 | American writer |
| Pozzi | Catherine Pozzi | 1882–1934 | 1882 | 1934 | French writer, Paul Valery's lover |
| Pram | Christen Pram | 1756–1821 | 1756 | 1821 | Norwegian/Danish economist and writer |
| Pravda | Hana Maria Pravda | 1916–2008 | 1916 | 2008 | Czechoslovak/English actress and Holocaust survivor |
| Prishvin | Mikhail Prishvin | 1873–1954 | 1873 | 1954 | Russian/Soviet writer |
| Pulszky | Ferenc Pulszky | 1814–1897 | 1814 | 1897 | Hungarian politician |
| Pușcariu | Sextil Pușcariu | 1877–1948 | 1877 | 1948 | Austro-Hungarian-born Romanian linguist and philologist |
| Pym | Barbara Pym | 1913–1980 | 1913 | 1980 | English novelist |
| Qiu Miaojin | Qiu Miaojin | 1969–1995 | 1969 | 1995 | 1969–1995), Taiwanese novelist |
| Queneau | Raymond Queneau | 1903–1976 | 1903 | 1976 | French writer |
| Rabe | John Rabe | 1882–1950 | 1882 | 1950 | German diplomat and Nazi official |
| Rachlew | Lillemor Rachlew | 1902–1983 | 1902 | 1983 | Norwegian Antarctic explorer |
| Rahman | Sheikh Mujibur Rahman | 1920–1925 | 1920 | 1925 | President and later Prime Minister of Bangladesh |
| Raiden Tameemon | Raiden Tameemon | 1767–1865 | 1767 | 1865 | 1767–1865), Japanese sumo wrestler |
| Rainer | Francisc Rainer | 1874–1944 | 1874 | 1944 | Austro-Hungarian-born Romanian pathologist and anthropologist |
| Ralfe | Catherine Hester Ralfe | 1831–1912 | 1831 | 1912 | New Zealand dressmaker and teacher |
| Ranfurly | Hermione, Countess of Ranfurly | 1913–2001 | 1913 | 2001 | Countess of Ranfurly (1913–2001), English secretary and diplomatic employee |
| Reagan | Ronald Reagan | 1911–2004 | 1911 | 2004 | 40th President of the United States |
| Reenstierna | Märta Helena Reenstierna | 1753–1841 | 1753 | 1841 | Swedish gentlewoman |
| Reich | Wilhelm Reich | 1897–1956 | 1897 | 1956 | Austrian physician and psychoanalyst |
| Repington | Charles à Court Repington | 1858–1925 | 1858 | 1925 | English military officer and war correspondent |
| Rétif | Nicolas-Edme Rétif | 1734–1806 | 1734 | 1806 | French novelist |
| Rich | Mary Rich, Countess of Warwick | 1625–1678 | 1625 | 1678 | Countess of Warwick (1625–1678), Irish maid of honour |
| Rickman | Alan Rickman | 1946–2016 | 1946 | 2016 | English actor and director |
| Ritchie | Charles Ritchie | 1906–1995 | 1906 | 1995 | Canadian diplomat |
| Robinson | Henry Crabb Robinson | 1775–1887 | 1775 | 1887 | English lawyer |
| Rollins | Henry Rollins | 1961– | 1961 | | American singer for Black Flag |
| Rondeau | Gérard Rondeau | 1953–2016 | 1953 | 2016 | French photographer |
| Roosevelt | Theodore Roosevelt | 1858–1919 | 1858 | 1919 | 26th President of the United States |
| Rorem | Ned Rorem | 1923–2022 | 1923 | 2022 | American composer |
| Rosenthal | Barbara Rosenthal | 1948– | 1948 | | American avant-garde New Media artist/writer/performer |
| Rosetti | Radu R. Rosetti | 1877–1949 | 1877 | 1949 | Romanian general and military historian |
| Ruess | Everett Ruess | 1914–1934 | 1914 | 1934 | American artist, poet and explorer |
| Rühmkorf | Peter Rühmkorf | 1929–2008 | 1929 | 2008 | German writer |
| Ruskin | John Ruskin | 1819–1900 | 1819 | 1900 | English art critic and philanthropist |
| Russell | Robert Russell | 1808–1900 | 1808 | 1900 | English-born Australian architect |
| Ryder | Dudley Ryder | 1691–1756 | 1691 | 1756 | English Lord Chief Justice (diary 1715–16) |
| Sadoul | Jacques Sadoul | 1881–1956 | 1881 | 1956 | French lawyer, politician and writer |
| Saeed | Hakeem Muhammad Saeed | 1920–1998 | 1920 | 1998 | Indian/Pakistani medical researcher and philanthropist |
| Salmonì | Rubino Romeo Salmonì | 1920–2011 | 1920 | 2011 | Italian author and Holocaust survivor |
| Sand | George Sand | 1804–1876 | 1804 | 1876 | French writer |
| Sanuto | Marino Sanuto | 1466–1536 | 1466 | 1536 | Venetian historian |
| Sarton | May Sarton | 1912–1995 | 1912 | 1995 | American poet and novelist |
| Sartre | Jean-Paul Sartre | 1905–1980 | 1905 | 1980 | French writer and philosopher |
| Sarzo | Rudy Sarzo | 1950– | 1950 | | Cuban-American rock bassist, notably of Ozzy Osbourne fame |
| Sassoon | Siegfried Sassoon | 1886–1967 | 1886 | 1967 | English poet and author |
| Satō | Eisaku Satō | 1901–1975 | 1901 | 1975 | 1901–1975), Japanese Prime Minister |
| Savicheva | Tanya Savicheva | 1930–1944 | 1930 | 1944 | Soviet child in the World War II Siege of Leningrad |
| Schelvis | Jules Schelvis | 1921–2016 | 1921 | 2016 | Dutch historian and Holocaust survivor |
| Schlesinger | Arthur M. Schlesinger, Jr. | 1917–2007 | 1917 | 2007 | American historian and political adviser |
| Schmelzer | Norbert Schmelzer | 1921–2008 | 1921 | 2008 | Dutch Catholic politician and diplomat |
| Schmidt | Frederik Schmidt | 1771–1840 | 1771 | 1840 | Danish-born Norwegian priest and poet |
| Scott | Robert Falcon Scott | 1868–1912 | 1868 | 1912 | English Antarctic explorer |
| Scott | Sir Walter Scott | 1771–1832 | 1771 | 1832 | Scottish novelist and poet |
| Sei Shōnagon | Sei Shōnagon | 966–1025 | 966 | 1025 | Japanese court lady and writer |
| Shaw | George Bernard Shaw | 1856–1950 | 1856 | 1950 | Irish Nobel Prize-winning playwright |
| Shelley | Mary Shelley | 1797–1851 | 1797 | 1851 | English novelist and travel writer |
| Sheridan | Betsy Sheridan | 1758–1837 | 1758 | 1837 | Irish writer, sister of the satirist Richard Brinsley Sheridan |
| Shields | Robert Shields | 1918–2007 | 1918 | 2007 | American teacher |
| Shifrin | Efim Shifrin | 1956– | 1956 | | Soviet/Russian actor and singer |
| Shiner | Michael Shiner | 1805–1880 | 1805 | 1880 | American freed slave and Navy Yard worker |
| Shirer | William L. Shirer | 1904–1993 | 1904 | 1993 | American journalist and contemporary historian |
| Shore | Emily Shore | 1819–1839 | 1819 | 1839 | English young adult |
| Silfverstolpe | Malla Silfverstolpe | 1782–1861 | 1782 | 1861 | Swedish salon hostess |
| Simcoe | Elizabeth Simcoe | 1762–1850 | 1762 | 1850 | English wife of Lieutenant Governor of Upper Canada |
| Șiugariu | Ion Șiugariu | 1914–1945 | 1914 | 1945 | Romanian poet |
| Sixx | Nikki Sixx | 1958– | 1958 | | American bassist/songwriter for Mötley Crüe |
| Skinner | John Skinner | 1772–1839 | 1772 | 1839 | English cleric and antiquarian |
| Slier | Philip Slier | 1923–1943 | 1923 | 1943 | Dutch typesetter and Holocaust victim |
| Smart | Elizabeth Smart | 1987– | 1987 | | American abduction victim and broadcaster |
| Somov | Konstantin Somov | 1869–1939 | 1869 | 1939 | Russian painter |
| Soutar | William Soutar | 1898–1943 | 1898 | 1943 | Scottish poet |
| Spark | Alexander Brodie Spark | 1792–1856 | 1792 | 1856 | Scottish-born Australian merchant and settler |
| Sparwenfeld | Johan Gabriel Sparwenfeld | 1655–1727 | 1655 | 1727 | Swedish diplomat and linguist |
| Spender | Stephen Spender | 1909–1995 | 1909 | 1995 | English poet |
| Spiegel | Renia Spiegel | 1924–1942 | 1924 | 1942 | Polish Jewish Holocaust victim |
| Steinbeck | John Steinbeck | 1902–1968 | 1902 | 1968 | American novelist |
| Steinhardt | Nicolae Steinhardt | 1912–1989 | 1912 | 1989 | Romanian writer and monk |
| Stendhal | Stendhal | 1783–1842 | 1783 | 1842 | Pseudonym of Marie-Henri Beyle, French novelist |
| Stevenson | Frances Stevenson | 1888–1972 | 1888 | 1972 | English mistress and second wife of British Prime Minister David Lloyd George |
| Stevenson | Margaret Stevenson | 1807–1874 | 1807 | 1874 | English-born Australian satirist |
| Stevenson | Robert Louis Stevenson | 1850–1894 | 1850 | 1894 | Scottish novelist, poet and travel writer |
| Stilwell | Joseph Stilwell | 1883–1946 | 1883 | 1946 | American World War II general |
| Stock | Joseph Stock | 1740–1813 | 1740 | 1813 | Irish Protestant bishop |
| Stoika | Constantin T. Stoika | 1892–1916 | 1892 | 1916 | Romanian poet, translator and army officer |
| Stott | Gordon Stott, Lord Stott | 1909–1999 | 1909 | 1999 | Lord Stott (1909–1999), Scottish advocate |
| Strauss | Richard Strauss | 1864–1949 | 1864 | 1949 | German composer |
| Strong | Roy Strong | 1935– | 1935 | | English gardener and aesthete |
| Sugawara no Takasue no Musume | Sugawara no Takasue no Musume | 1008–1059 | 1008 | 1059 | Japanese writer |
| Sukemasa Irie | Sukemasa Irie | 1905–1985 | 1905 | 1985 | Japanese essayist and Grand Chamberlain of Japan |
| Sutcliff | Rosemary Sutcliff | 1920–1992 | 1920 | 1992 | English historical novelist for children and young adults |
| Swete | John Swete | 1752–1821 | 1752 | 1821 | English cleric and artist |
| Symonds | Richard Symonds | 1617–1660 | 1617 | 1660 | English Civil War diaries |
| Takashi Nagai | Takashi Nagai | 1908–1951 | 1908 | 1951 | 1908–1951), Japanese Catholic physician and Nagasaki survivor |
| Takizawa Bakin | Takizawa Bakin | 1867–1948 | 1867 | 1948 | 1867–1948), Japanese gesaku writer |
| Tarnow | Fanny Tarnow | 1779–1862 | 1779 | 1862 | German fiction and non-fiction writer |
| Tchaikovsky | Pyotr Ilyich Tchaikovsky | 1840–1893 | 1840 | 1893 | Russian composer |
| Templeton Strong | George Templeton Strong | 1820–1875 | 1820 | 1875 | American lawyer |
| Teonge | Henry Teonge | 1620–1690 | 1620 | 1690 | English naval chaplain (diaries 1675–76 and 1678–79) |
| Terdiman | Daniel Terdiman | | | | American award-winning journalist |
| Tersmeden | Carl Tersmeden | 1715–1797 | 1715 | 1797 | Swedish admiral |
| Thomas | Mary Thomas | 1787–1835 | 1787 | 1835 | English-born Australian poet |
| Thomlinson | John Thomlinson | 1692–1761 | 1692 | 1761 | English cleric (diary 1717–1722) |
| Thoreau | Henry David Thoreau | 1817–1862 | 1817 | 1862 | American author and philosopher |
| Thrale | Hester Thrale | 1740–1821 | 1740 | 1821 | Welsh author, friend and confidante of Samuel Johnson |
| Tipper | Kathleen Tipper | 1919– | 1919 | | English wartime clerk |
| Tolstaya | Sophia Tolstaya | 1844–1919 | 1844 | 1919 | Russian wife of author Leo Tolstoy |
| Tolstoy | Leo Tolstoy | 1828–1910 | 1828 | 1910 | Russian novelist and social reformer |
| Treloar | William Treloar | 1843–1923 | 1843 | 1923 | English haberdasher and Lord Mayor of London (diary 1906–1907) |
| Trench | Melesina Trench | 1768–1827 | 1768 | 1827 | Irish writer and poet |
| Tripathi | Govardhanram Tripathi | 1855–1907 | 1855 | 1907 | Indian Gujarati-language writer |
| Truitt | Anne Truitt | 1921–2004 | 1921 | 2004 | American artist |
| Truman | Harry S. Truman | 1884–1972 | 1884 | 1972 | 33rd President of the United States |
| Truscott | Meta Truscott | 1917–2014 | 1917 | 2014 | (1917–2014), Australian chronicler and local historian (diaries 1934–2014) |
| Tsekhanovsky | Mikhail Tsekhanovsky | 1889–1965 | 1889 | 1965 | Russian/Soviet artist and illustrator |
| Tsvetaeva | Marina Ivanovna Tsvetaeva | 1892–1941 | 1892 | 1941 | Russian poet and writer |
| Tuck | George Albert Tuck | 1884–1981 | 1884 | 1981 | New Zealand builder and soldier |
| Turner | Thomas Turner | 1729–1793 | 1729 | 1793 | English shopkeeper |
| Tyszkiewicz | Anna Tyszkiewicz | 1779–1867 | 1779 | 1867 | Polish noblewoman |
| Uda | Emperor Uda | 866–931 | 866 | 931 | 866–931), Japanese Emperor |
| Udall | Ida Hunt Udall | 1858–1915 | 1858 | 1915 | American homesteader |
| Umewaka Minoru I | Umewaka Minoru I | 1828–1909 | 1828 | 1909 | 1828–1909), Japanese Noh actor |
| Vaid | Krishna Baldev Vaid | 1927–2020 | 1927 | 2020 | Indian fiction writer and playwright |
| Varma | C. Raja Raja Varma | –1905 | | 1905 | Indian painter |
| Vassiltchikov | Marie Vassiltchikov | 1917–1978 | 1917 | 1978 | Russian princess involved in plot to kill Hitler |
| Victoria | Queen Victoria | 1819–1901 | 1819 | 1901 | British queen and empress |
| Villard | Léonie Villard | 1890–1962 | 1890 | 1962 | French critic and university professor |
| Vivien | Renée Vivien | 1877–1909 | 1877 | 1909 | French and English writer |
| Voinescu | Alice Voinescu | 1885–1961 | 1885 | 1961 | Romanian writer, translator and university professor |
| von Goethe | Johann Wolfgang von Goethe | 1749–1832 | 1749 | 1832 | German writer and statesman |
| von Heyking | Elisabeth von Heyking | 1861–1925 | 1861 | 1925 | German novelist and travel writer |
| von Zinzendorf | Karl von Zinzendorf | 1739–1813 | 1739 | 1813 | Saxon Austrian civil servant |
| Wagner | Cosima Wagner | 1837–1930 | 1837 | 1930 | German daughter of Franz Liszt, second wife of Richard Wagner |
| Wagner | Richard Wagner | 1813–1873 | 1813 | 1873 | German composer |
| Walker | Alice Walker | 1944– | 1944 | | American author |
| Walter | Jakob Walter | 1788–1864 | 1788 | 1864 | German soldier in the Napoleonic Wars |
| Warhol | Andy Warhol | 1928–1987 | 1928 | 1987 | American artist |
| Waugh | Evelyn Waugh | 1903–1966 | 1903 | 1966 | English novelist |
| Webb | Beatrice Webb | 1858–1943 | 1858 | 1943 | English sociologist and social reformer |
| Weil | Simone Weil | 1909–1943 | 1909 | 1943 | French philosopher |
| Weimann | Gisela Weimann | 1943– | 1943 | | German multimedia artist |
| Weinsberg | Hermann Weinsberg | 1518–1597 | 1518 | 1597 | German city councilor in Cologne |
| Weisse | Johan Peter Weisse | 1832–1886 | 1832 | 1886 | Norwegian philologist |
| Welch | Denton Welch | 1915–1948 | 1915 | 1948 | English writer and painter |
| Wesley | John Wesley | 1703–1791 | 1703 | 1791 | English theologian and founder of the Methodist movement |
| West | Algernon West | 1832–1921 | 1832 | 1921 | English civil servant |
| Whisker | Alexander Whisker | 1819–1907 | 1819 | 1907 | New Zealand soldier |
| White | Gilbert White | 1720–1793 | 1720 | 1793 | English naturalist and Anglican cleric |
| Whiteley | Opal Whiteley | 1897–1992 | 1897 | 1992 | American naturalist and nature writer |
| Whitlam | Margaret Whitlam | 1919–2012 | 1919 | 2012 | Australian Olympic swimmer, writer and social campaigner |
| Whitney | Dorothy Payne Whitney | 1887–1968 | 1887 | 1968 | American social activist and lecturer |
| Wiesel | Elie Wiesel | 1928–2016 | 1928 | 2016 | Romanian-American author |
| Wilkes | John Wilkes | 1725–1797 | 1725 | 1797 | English journalist and politician |
| Williams | Kenneth Williams | 1926–1988 | 1926 | 1988 | English comic actor |
| Williams-Wynn | Charlotte Williams-Wynn | 1807–1869 | 1807 | 1869 | English gentlewoman |
| Wilmot | Katherine Wilmot | 1773–1824 | 1773 | 1824 | Irish traveller |
| Wilson | Edmund Wilson | 1895–1972 | 1895 | 1972 | American writer and critic |
| Wilson | Edward Adrian Wilson | 1872–1912 | 1872 | 1912 | English naturalist and Antarctic explorer |
| Wilson | Sir Henry Wilson, 1st Baronet | 1864–1922 | 1864 | 1922 | English military officer |
| Windham | William Windham | 1750–1810 | 1750 | 1810 | English statesman and orator |
| Winslow | Anna Green Winslow | 1759–1780 | 1759 | 1780 | American child diarist |
| Wojnarowicz | David Wojnarowicz | 1954–1992 | 1954 | 1992 | American painter and performer |
| Wold | Knut Getz Wold | 1915–1987 | 1915 | 1987 | Norwegian economist and civil servant |
| Woodford | Robert Woodford | 1606–1664 | 1606 | 1664 | English lawyer |
| Woodforde | James Woodforde | 1740–1803 | 1740 | 1803 | English rural cleric |
| Woodmason | Charles Woodmason | 1720–1789 | 1720 | 1789 | American author, poet and loyalist (South Carolina journal late 1760s) |
| Woodruff | Wilford Woodruff | 1807–1898 | 1807 | 1898 | 4th President of the Church of Jesus Christ of Latter-day Saints |
| Woolf | Virginia Woolf | 1882–1941 | 1882 | 1941 | English author and feminist |
| Wordsworth | Dorothy Wordsworth | 1771–1855 | 1771 | 1855 | English poet, sister of William Wordsworth |
| Wyatt | Woodrow Wyatt | 1918–1997 | 1918 | 1997 | American politician and journalist |
| Wyndham | Joan Wyndham | 1921–2007 | 1921 | 2007 | English memoirist |
| Yi Kyu-won | Yi Kyu-won | 1833–1901 | 1833 | 1901 | Korean military official |
| Yi Sun-sin | Yi Sun-sin | 1545–1598 | 1545 | 1598 | Korean admiral and military general |
| Yoko Moriwaki | Yoko Moriwaki | 1932–1945 | 1932 | 1945 | Japanese diarist and Hiroshima victim |
| Young | Zina D. H. Young | 1821–1901 | 1821 | 1901 | President of the Relief Society |
| Zaciu | Mircea Zaciu | 1928–2000 | 1928 | 2000 | Romanian critic and literary historian |
| Żeromski | Stefan Żeromski | 1864–1925 | 1864 | 1925 | Polish novelist and dramatist |
| Zheng Xiaoxu | Zheng Xiaoxu | 1860–1938 | 1860 | 1938 | Chinese politician, poet and calligrapher |
| Zherebtsova | Polina Zherebtsova | 1985– | 1985 | | Russian Chechen documentarian and poet |
| Zissu | A. L. Zissu | 1888–1956 | 1888 | 1956 | Romanian writer and Jewish spokesman |
| Żychliński | Ludwik Żychliński | 1837–1901 | 1837 | 1901 | Polish military officer |
| Żychliński | Teodor Żychliński | 1830–1909 | 1830 | 1909 | Polish herald and author |

== Diaries of disputed authenticity ==
- The Black Diaries purportedly written by Roger Casement and detailing his alleged homosexual activities, are believed by some to be a forgery perpetrated by the British government.

== See also ==
- List of Australian diarists of World War I
- List of dream diaries
- List of fictional diaries
- List of fictional diaries § Hoax diaries
- List of longest diaries
