= Bilbrough (surname) =

Bilbrough is a surname. Notable people with the surname include:

- Ethel Bilbrough (1868–1951), British diarist, artist, and newspaper writer
- Harold Bilbrough (1867–1950), British Anglican bishop
