= George Bollinger =

George Bollinger may refer to:

- George Frederick Bollinger (1770–1842), settler in Missouri
- George Wallace Bollinger (1890–1917), New Zealand soldier and diarist
