= Charles John Ayton =

New Zealand goldminer, rabbiter, labourer and diarist

- Born: 24 February 1846; Newcastle upon Tyne, Northumberland, England
- Died: 29 July 1922 (aged 76)

Charles John Ayton (24 February 1846 – 29 July 1922) was a New Zealand goldminer, rabbiter, rural labourer and diarist. He was born in Newcastle upon Tyne, Northumberland, England, on 24 February 1846.
