= Frances Dallam Peter =

- Born: 28 January 1843
- Died: 5 August 1864 (aged 21)
- Occupation: Diarist
- Parent(s): Robert Peter; Frances Paca Dallam Peter

Frances Dallam Peter (January 28, 1843 – August 5, 1864) was a writer from Lexington, Kentucky who documented the United States Civil War in her diary. The diary, published under the title, A Union Woman in Civil War Kentucky: The Diary of Frances Peter, describes the period between January 1862 to April 1864 in Lexington.

== Early life and family ==
Frances Dallam Peter was born in Lexington, Kentucky on January 28, 1843, as the fourth of eleven children of Robert Peter and Frances Paca Dallam Peter. Peter's childhood nicknamed was Frank.

Her mother, Frances Paca Dallam Peter, was related to William Paca who Governor Maryland and signed the United States Declaration of Independence. Her father, Robert Peter, a chemist, geologist, and physician, was a native of Cornwall, England. Robert Peter entered the United States in 1817 and relocated to Lexington in 1832 to attend Transylvania College. He obtained a medical degree from Transylvania in 1834. The next year Robert Peter and Frances Paca Dallam married and set up a household in Lexington. Robert held several positions at Transylvania including the chair of the pharmacy and chemistry departments, and dean of the faculty, librarian of the medical school, and editor of the medical school journal. During the United States Civil War, he was the senior surgeon for the United States Army in Lexington and was the administrator of the military hospitals in the area. Peter grew up in a family that had a leadership role in Lexington.

== Civil War diary ==
From the age of 10, Peter wrote a diary that told of her life in Lexington. Peter's diary primarily discussed life outside her household with news of civic actives instead of the personal life of her family.

Her writing during the Civil War, between January 1862 to April 1864, were published under the name A Union Woman in Civil War Kentucky: The Diary of Frances Peter.
