= Kajūji Mitsutoyo =

Japanese noble

Kajūji Mitsutoyo (勧修寺光豊, January 7, 1576 – November 18, 1612) was a Japanese noble of the early Edo period. He was the author of the "Mitsutoyo Diary" (光豊公記), which is considered a valuable source of information relating to the Edo period.
