= František Bass =

Jewish Czech poet and child victim of the Holocaust (1930–1944)

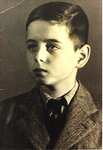
- Born: 4 September 1930; Brno, Czechoslovakia
- Died: 28 October 1944 (aged 14); Auschwitz concentration camp

František "Franta" Bass (4 September 1930 – 28 October 1944) was a Jewish Czech poet and child victim of the Holocaust.

Bass wrote poems while in the Theresienstadt Ghetto. His work was published in the ghetto's secret magazine, Vedem. It was later featured in the book, I Never Saw Another Butterfly (1994), a compilation of art and poetry by children of Theresienstadt.

== Life ==
Bass was born on 4 September 1930 in Brno, Czechoslovakia. He was Jewish.

Bass was forced into the Theresienstadt Ghetto on 2 December 1941. While there, he wrote poems that referenced his experiences. His poems were published in the Vedem, a secret magazine that was created by teenage boys in the ghetto.

Bass was sent to Auschwitz on 10 October 1944. He was killed there on 28 October 1944.

His poems were featured in I Never Saw Another Butterfly, a compilation of art and poetry by children of Theresienstadt. His most notable works include the poem Zahrada ('the garden'), written in Theresienstadt.

== See also ==
- Petr Ginz
