= Catherine Hester Ralfe =

Catherine Hester Ralfe (1831–1912) was a New Zealand dressmaker, teacher, storekeeper, housekeeper and diarist.

== Biography ==
She was born in Bantry Bay, County Cork, Ireland in about 1831.
