= Nathaniel Bryceson =

Nathaniel Bryceson (5 June 1826 – 23 March 1911) was a Victorian clerk remembered for his diary which gives a rare, detailed insight into the daily life of the mid nineteenth century.

== Early life ==
Nathaniel was born in the workhouse on 5 June 1826. He was christened Nathaniel White on 4 July 1826. His father was also Nathaniel White, a pauper. Whilst little more is known of his early life, it is known he worked as an errand boy and for an undertaker, which may explain his fascination with death and almost weekly visits to cemeteries and graveyards. He wrote his diary when aged 19, while working as a clerk in a Lea's coal wharf, close to Buckingham Palace Road today. He later became a clerk, an accountant and a book store owner.

== Surviving diary ==
Although he makes references to other diaries, the only one to survive covers the majority of 1846, from 1 January to 12 December. A single entry from his 1848 journal survives as it was referenced in 'Notes and Queries: For Readers and Writers, Collectors and Librarians' in 1914.

The diary is also interesting in the relationships that he holds with the women. His ailing mother Mary, his obsession with Mary Sanigear, (a John Bunyan descendant, referred to as Mrs Skirricker in the diary), his girlfriend Ann Fox, a charwoman, who was twenty six years his senior, and his beloved grandmother, "Granny" Sheppard. The diary is also notable for the colourful and graphic attempts he makes at intimacy with Fox, written in shorthand to hide the explicit content.

== Marriage ==
Bryceson married Sarah Clark in 1854, by whom he had at least seven children, four of whom survived to adulthood.

== Death ==
His wife Sarah died in 1890. Nathaniel Bryceson himself died in Stepney, at his daughter's house at 102 Dempsey St, on 23 March 1911 at the age of 84 and was buried in Islington Cemetery, Finchley with his wife Sarah and son Nathaniel who died in February 1911. St Pancras and Islington Cemetery.

== Legacy ==
His only surviving, handwritten diary was bought for the sum of £115 in 1974 by Westminster council from a collector by the name of Miss Myers and, whilst some of it had fallen victim to water damage, the majority of it was eventually released online in 2010 by a group of archivist volunteers. It was later serialised as a daily blog.
