= Pierre Minet =

French poet and writer

Pierre Minet (Reims 1909– Paris 1975) was a 20th-century French poet and writer, whose early career is closely associated to the Grand Jeu movement and to his devotion to Roger Gilbert-Lecomte. Critics, who have contrasted the small size of his production with its substantive and stylistic quality, recognise in La Défaite, published in 1947 and subtitled "Confessions", an autobiographical masterpiece, its author's definitive claim to literary fame, that attracted the praise of Antonin Artaud ("une sensibilité unique au monde" ["a thoroughly unique sensibility"]) and of André Breton ("Celui qui sait parler de la liberté comme il en parle est moins vaincu que quiconque" ["Someone who knows how to speak of freedom as he does is less defeated than anyone"]) – while the great Italian critic and writer Roberto Bazlen declared he had never read "un livre dans lequel l’intolérance est aussi constitutive, et aussi echt (authentique), et aussi éloignée de toute possibilité de compromis..." ["a book so intransigent, so authentic in its rejection of any possibility of compromise..."]. Somehow branded as a "livre-culte", La Défaite has had four editions, the latest one by Allia (2010), and has so far been translated in Spanish (La derrota, Pepitas de calabaza, 2018) and Italian (La sconfitta, Neri Pozza, 2023) to critical acclaim. Also a playwright, radio producer and journalist, Minet has left a dense diary of which extracts have been published (En mal d’Aurore, Journal 1932–1975, Le bois d'Orion, 2002).

The corresponding entry "Pierre Minet" of the Literary Encyclopedia contains a comprehensive summary of Minet's life and works: [http://www.litencyc.com/php/speople.php?rec=true&UID=13202]
