= Constance de Castelbajac =

French aristocrat and diarist

- Born: Constance Breteuil; 1859
- Died: 1886 (aged 26–27)
- Occupation: Diarist

Constance de Castelbajac (1859–1886) was a French aristocrat and diarist. She served as the Marchioness of Castelbajac.

In her diary, she argued that Jewish women who converted to Christianity upon marrying remained Jewish. Furthermore, she disapproved of such inter-faith marriages. Professor Catherine Nicault of the University of Reims Champagne-Ardenne has argued that Castelbajac's views exemplified the way the French aristocracy was hostile towards Jews in the 19th century, who they viewed as parvenus.

== Works ==
- Mension-Rigaud, Eric, ed. (2003). Journal de Constance de Castelbajac, marquise de Breteuil : 1885-1886. Paris: Perrin. ISBN 9782262020552. OCLC 52813027.
