= Kazimierz Bujnicki =

Polish writer

Kazimierz Bujnicki (30 November 1788 in Krasław (nowadays Krāslava) – 14 July 1878 in Dagda, Latvia) was a Polish writer.

Kazimierz Bujnicki was son of Andrzej, a podkomorzy of Vitebsk (podkomorzy witebski), and his wife Anna. He was born on 30 November 1788 in Krasław.

From 1842 to 1849 he was an editor of "Rubon" (Wilno). He was a contributor to "Tygodnik Petersburski", "Ateneum" and "Kronika rodzinna". Bujnicki was also an author of a diary (Pamiętniki).

== Publications ==
- Wędrówka po małych drogach. Szkice obyczajów na prowincji, T. I, Wilno 1841.
- Wędrówka po małych drogach. Szkice obyczajów na prowincji, T. II, Wilno 1841.
- Siostra Giertruda. Powieść wierszem napisana, Wilno 1842.
- Rubon. Pismo poświęcone pożytecznej rozrywce, Wilno 1842–1849.
- Komedye prozą i wierszem, Wilno 1851.
- Nowa wędrówka po małych drogach. Szkice obyczajowe, T. I, Wilno 1852.
- Nowa wędrówka po małych drogach. Szkice obyczajowe, T. II, Wilno 1852.
- Pamiętniki księdza Jordana. Obrazek Inflant w XVII wieku, Tom I. Wilno 1852.
- Pamiętniki księdza Jordana: obrazek Inflant w XVII wieku, Tom II. Wilno 1852.
- Stara panna. Powieść współczesna, Wilno 1855.
- Biórko. Obrazek obyczajowy z lat ostatnich minionego wieku, Cz. 1, Wilno 1862.
- Biórko. Obrazek obyczajowy z lat ostatnich minionego wieku, Cz. 2, Wilno 1862.
