= Léonie Villard =

Léonie Villard (1878–1970) was a French literary critic and professor at the Université de Lyon. She was the first woman to be a professor of literature at a French university. In 1917 she received the Rose Mary Crawshay Prize for her book, Jane Austen: Sa Vie et Son Oeuvre. She was also a member of the faculty of Mount Holyoke College in 1937 and 1950–1951. The college holds her diary of life in Vichy France during the Second World War. It was translated into French and published alongside a biography and bibliography in 2024.

== Selected publications ==
- Jane Austen: Sa Vie et Son Oeuvre. 1915.
- La Femme anglaise au XIXe siècle et son évolution d'après le roman anglais contemporain. Paris, 1920.
- Le Théâtre Américain. Boivin & Cie, Paris, c. 1929.
- La Poésie Américaine. Trois siècles de poésie lyrique et de poèmes narratifs. Paris, 1945.
- Essai de Psychologie de la Grammaire Anglaise. Paris, 1957.
- for a complete biobliography, check the Journal de guerre: Lyon sous l'Occupation, 1940-1944
