= Nicholas Peacock =

- Occupation: Farmer
- Known for: Diary of his daily life and work
- Spouse: Catherine Chapman (m. 1747)

Nicholas Peacock was a farmer from County Limerick in Ireland, who kept a diary from the years 1740 to 1751. It was a detailed account of his daily life and work, living in the townlands of Kilcorly and Kilmoreen, Adare.

When it was published in 2006, the diary was described by its editor as "a valuable record of the day to day life of a man living at a level of Irish society of which we know little or nothing. This diary is one of the most complex and detailed accounts existing of life in rural Ireland in the mid-eighteenth century".

== Family ==
Nicholas Peacock was the son, one of several children, of Nicholas Peacock Senior and Ann Pike. Peacock married Catherine Chapman of Lisdogan, County Cork, in 1747, and had at least three children. His son eldest son, Price, was born in 1748, and a Price Peacock of Kilmoreen was listed as a freeholder there in 1766. Their two other sons, George and William, were born in 1749 and 1750.
