= Thura Al Windawi =

Iraqi writer (born 1983)

Thura Al-Windawi is an Iraqi writer. She is the author of Thura's Diary, which was written by her on the eve of and during the Iraq War. It shows her life during this time and explains the harsh times there were. Later, it was published and it caught the attention of a British journalist. She was born in 1983 to a British-educated father and a middle-class Iraqi mother and attended both the University of Baghdad and the University of Pennsylvania; she studied pharmacology at Baghdad.
