= Ethel Bilbrough =

English diarist, pianist and artist (1868–1951)

Ethel Mary Bilbrough
- Ethel reading to her sister
- Born: 1868
- Died: 1951 (aged 82–83)
- Occupation: Diarist
- Spouse: Kenneth Bilbrough

Ethel Mary Bilbrough (1868 to 1951) was a First World War diarist, artist and newspaper writer.

== Writing ==
Bilbrough was a keen writer to national newspapers in addition to an accomplished pianist and artist. Her writing extended into composing several pieces of music for piano and voice. Over sixty watercolours and drawings by Ethel are held in the Victoria and Albert museum.

== Ethel's war diary (1914–1918) ==
In 1915, Bilbrough, then in her mid-forties, began keeping a diary. In it she recorded her thoughts about what it was like to live through the war.

"Another great explosion shook the windows, and the hooters at Woolwich began to scream like things demented, and the guns started frantically firing all round us like an almighty fugue, I knew that this was no raid, but the signing of the armistice had been accomplished! Signal upon signal took up the news, the glorious pulverising news, that the end had come at last, and the greatest war in history was over." - Monday 11 November 1918.

The diaries were part memoir, part scrapbook and were undiscovered until after her death in 1951 by her husband Kenneth's second wife, Elsie. They were donated to the Imperial War Museum in 1961. Recognised as an important source of information on life on the Home Front during World War One, the diaries were published in 2014.

== Personal life ==
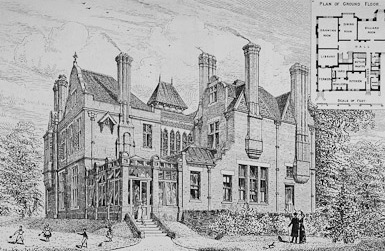
Their house Elmstead Grange in 1879

Bilbrough lived in Chislehurst, Kent, with her husband, Kenneth an insurance executive. The couple married in 1897 and were relatively wealthy. They were living in Elmstead Grange surrounded by 22 acres of land. Kenneth's success derived from a fleet of clipper ships and marine insurance.

They left Elmstead Grange in 1940 and it then became a private school called Babington House School. After Kenneth's retirement, the couple lived in Wiltshire until Ethel's death in 1951, aged eighty-three.
