= George Wallace Bollinger =

New Zealand soldier and diarist (1890–1917)

George Wallace Bollinger (10 April 1890 – 10 June 1917) was a New Zealand soldier and diarist. He was born in Omata, Taranaki, New Zealand on 10 April 1890.
