= List of Holocaust diarists =

Diarists who wrote diaries concerning the Holocaust (1941-1945). English translations of some of these diaries are commercially available; for example, Anne Frank's, Eva Heyman's, and Janusz Korczak's.

- Jadwiga Ankiewicz: Ankiewicz, Jadwiga (2021). Laskowska, Jolanta (ed.). Majdanek 15-I-18-v-43r (in Polish and English). Państwowe Muzeum na Majdanku. ISBN 9788362816774.
- Janina Altman
- Molly Applebaum: Applebaum, Molly (2017). Grabowski, Jan (ed.). Buried Words: The Diary of Molly Applebaum. Azrieli Foundation. ISBN 9781988065274.
- Mary Berg: Berg, Mary (2013). The Diary of Mary Berg: Growing Up in the Warsaw Ghetto. Oneworld Publications. ISBN 9781780744469.
- Hélène Berr (1921–1945): Berr, Hélène (2008). The Journal of Hélène Berr. Translated by Bell, David. MacLehose Press. ISBN 978-1-906694-19-7.
- Jacques Bielinski (1930–1942): Bielinski, Jacques (1992). Journal 1940–1942: Un journaliste juif à Paris sous l'Occupation (in French). Éditions du Cerf.
- Eliszewa Binder (1920-1942?): Zapruder, Alexandra, ed. (2015). Salvaged Pages, Multimedia Edition: Young Writers' Diaries of the Holocaust. Yale University Press. ISBN 9780300206029.
- Edith Bown-Jacobowitz: Bown-Jacobowitz, Edith (February 22, 2014). Memories and Reflections: A Refugee's Story. CreateSpace Independent Publishing Platform. ISBN 978-1-906694-19-7.
- Miriam Chaszczewacki (1924–1942): Stefania, Heilbrunn; Chaszczewacki, Miriam (March 18, 2013). Children of Dust and Heaven: a Diary from Nazi Occupation Through the Holocaust. CreateSpace Independent Publishing Platform. ISBN 9781481865616.
- Willy Cohn (1888-1941): Cohn, Willy (2012). No Justice in Germany: The Breslau Diaries, 1933-1941. Stanford University Press. ISBN 0804773246.
- Abraham Cytryn (1927–1944): Cytryn, Abraham (2005). Newman, Su; Naor, Chaya (eds.). Youth Writing Behind the Walls: Avraham Cytryn's Lodz Notebooks. Yad Vashem Publications. ISBN 978-0-9764425-1-6.
- Adam Czerniaków (1880–1942): Czerniaków, Adam (1999). Hilberg, Raul; Staron, Stanisław; Kermisz, Josef (eds.). The Warsaw Diary of Adam Czerniakow: Prelude to Doom. Translated by Staron, Stanisław. Ivan R. Dee. ISBN 978-1-56663-230-0.
- Arnold Daghani (1909-1985): Daghani, Arnold (2009). Schultz, Deborah; Timms, Edward (eds.). Arnold Daghani's Memories of Mikhailowka: The Illustrated Diary of a Slave Labour Camp Survivor. Vallentine Mitchell. ISBN 9780853036388.
- Hilda Dajč
- Helga Deen (1925–1943): Deen, Helga. Dit is om nooit meer te vergeten: Dagboek en brieven van Helga Deen, 1943 (in Dutch).
- Emil Dorian (1893-1956): Dorian, Emil (1982). Dorian, Marguerite (ed.). Quality of Witness: A Romanian Diary, 1937-1944. Translated by Vamos, Mara Soceanu. Jewish Publication Society of America. ISBN 9780827602113.
- Erich Dublon Deen, Helga. Dit is om nooit meer te vergeten: Dagboek en brieven van Helga Deen, 1943 (in Dutch).
- Diet Eman (1920-2019): Eman, Diet (2008). Things We Couldn't Say: A Dramatic Account of Christian Resistance in Holland During World War II. Lighthouse Trails Pub. ISBN 9780979131578.
- Julius Feldman (1923–1943): Feldman, Julius (2002). The Krakow Diary of Julius Feldman. Translated by Brand, William. Quill Press. ISBN 978-0-9536280-8-7.
- Sarah Fishkin (1924–1942): Fishkin, Sarah (2005). Fishkin, Jacob (ed.). Heaven and Earth: The Diary of Sarah Fishkin. YIVO Institute for Jewish Research. ISBN 978-1-4208-7156-2.
- Luigi Fleischmann (1928-1999): Fleischmann, Luigi (2007). From Fiume to Navelli: A Sixteen-Year-Old's Narrative of the Fleischmann Family and Other Free Internees in Fascist Italy, September 1943 - June 1944. Yad Vashem. ISBN 9789653082977.
- Moshe Flinker (1926–1944): Flinker, Moshe (1971). Young Moshe's Diary: The Spiritual Torment of a Jewish Boy in Nazi Europe. Yad Vashem Publications.
- Heniek Fogel (1922-2011): Fogel, Heniek (2015). A Hidden Diary from the Lódz Ghetto, 1942-1944. Yad Vashem. ISBN 9789653085008.
- Anne Frank (1929–1945): Frank, Anne. The Diary of a Young Girl. Doubleday. ISBN 978-0-385-47378-1.
- Aba Gefen (1922-2025): Gefen, Aba (1989). Hope in Darkness: The Aba Gefen Diaries. Translated by Friedman, Ina. Holocaust Library. ISBN 9780896041264.
- Petr Ginz (1928–1944): Ginz, Petr (2007). Pressburger, Chava (ed.). The Diary of Petr Ginz, 1941–1942. Translated by Lappin, Elena. Atlantic Monthly Press. ISBN 978-0-87113-966-5.
- Samuel Golfard: Lower, Wendy (September 8, 2015). The Diary of Samuel Golfard and the Holocaust in Galicia. Bloomsbury Academic. ISBN 9780759120792.
- Zalman Gradowski
- Lili Hahn Hahn, Lili (1974). White Flags of Surrender. Translated by Milton, Sibyl. R.B. Luce. ISBN 0883310627.
- Abel J. Herzberg Herzberg, Abel J. (April 15, 1997). Between Two Streams: A Diary from Bergen-Belsen. Translated by Santcross, Jack. Tauris Parke Paperbacks. ISBN 978-1860641213.
- Éva Heyman (1931–1944): Heyman, Éva (1988). Marton, Judah (ed.). The Diary of Éva Heyman. Translated by Kohn, Moshe M. Shapolsky Publishers. ISBN 978-0-933503-89-2.
- Etty Hillesum (1914–1943): Hillesum, Etty (1996). An Interrupted Life: The Diaries, 1941–1943; and Letters from Westerbork. Translated by Pomerans, Arnold J. Picador. ISBN 978-0-8050-5087-5.
- Ingrid Jacoby Jacoby, Ingrid (1998). My Darling Diary: Volume 1: A Wartime Journal - Vienna 1937-39, Falmouth 1939-44. United Writers Publications Ltd. ISBN 1852000805.
- David Kahane
- Zelig Kalmanovich
- Erwin Helmuth Kampelmacher (1920-2011) Kampelmacher, E. H. (Dan) (2006). Fighting For Survival. Yad Vashem. ISBN 9780976073963.
- Chaim Aron Kaplan (1880–1942): Kaplan, Chaim Aron (1999). Katsh, Abraham I. (ed.). Scroll of Agony: The Warsaw Diary of Chaim A. Kaplan. Translated by Katsh, Abraham I. Indiana University Press. ISBN 978-0-253-21293-1.
- Elsa Katz (d. 1944): Katz, Elsa. A Theresienstadt Diary: Letters to Veruska. Translated by Schiff, Vera.
- Yitzhak Katznelson: Yitzhak, Katzenelson (1972). Vittel Diary (22.5.43 - 16.9.43). Translated by Cohen, Myer. Ghetto Fighters' House.
- Edmund Kessler: Kessler, Edmund (2010). Kessler, Renata (ed.). The Wartime Diary of Edmund Kessler. Academic Studies Press. ISBN 9781934843987.
- Victor Klemperer (1881-1960): Klemperer, Victor (1999). I Will Bear Witness: A Diary of the Nazi Years, 1933-1941. Translated by Chalmers, Martin. Modern Library. ISBN 0375756973. Klemperer, Victor (2001). I Will Bear Witness 1942-1945: A Diary of the Nazi Years. Translated by Chalmers, Martin. Modern Library. ISBN 0375756973.
- Chajka Klinger (1917-1958) Klinger, Chajka (2017). Ronen, Avihu (ed.). I Am Writing These Words to You: The Original Diaries, Będzin 1943. Translated by Brzostowska, Anna; Giebułtowski, Jerzy. Yad Vashem. ISBN 9789653085480.
- Aryeh Klonicki (1906–1943): Klonicki, Aryeh (1973). The Diary of Adam's Father: The Diary of Aryeh Klonicki (Klonymus) and His Wife Malwina, with Letters Concerning the Fate of Their Child Adam. Translated by Tomaschoff, Avner. Ghetto Fighters' House and Hakibbutz Hameuchad Publishing House.
- Věra Kohnová (1929–1942): Kohnová, Věra (2006). Deník Věry Kohnové: Diary of Věra Kohnová (in English and German). Zdeněk Susa. ISBN 9788086057408.
- David Koker (1921–1945): Koker, David (2012). van Pelt, Robert Jan (ed.). At the Edge of the Abyss: A Concentration Camp Diary, 1943–1944. Translated by Horn, Michiel; Irons, John. Northwestern University Press. ISBN 978-0-8101-2636-7.
- Janusz Korczak (1878–1942): Korczak, Janusz (2003). Ghetto Diary. Yale University Press.
- Heinz Salvator Kounio Kounio, Heinz Salvator (2003). A Liter of Soup and Sixty Grams of Bread: The Diary of Prisoner Number 109565. Sephardic House. ISBN 9780819707635.
- Herman Kruk (1897–1944): Kruk, Herman (2002). Harshav, Benjamin (ed.). The Last Days of the Jerusalem of Lithuania: Chronicles from the Vilna Ghetto and the Camps, 1939–1944. Translated by Harshav, Barbara. Yale University Press. ISBN 978-0-300-04494-2.
- Madelaine D. Lang: Lang, Madelaine D. (2012). Diary of a Young Jewish Girl: World War II Hungary 1941-1946. CreateSpace Independent Publishing Platform. ISBN 9781475206623.
- Leib Langfus
- Rutka Laskier (1929–1943): Laskier, Rutka (2007). Zaidman-Mauer, Daniella (ed.). Rutka's Notebook: January–April 1943. Yad Vashem. ISBN 978-0-9764425-7-8.
- Hanna Lévy-Hass (1913-2001): Lévy-Hass, Hanna (2009). Diary of Bergen-Belsen: 1944-1945. Haymarket Books. ISBN 9781931859875.
- Abraham Lewin (1893–1943): Lewin, Abraham (1988). Polonsky, Antony (ed.). A Cup of Tears: A Diary of the Warsaw Ghetto. Blackwell. ISBN 978-0-631-16215-5.
- Ruthka Lieblich (1926–1942): Lieblich, Ruthka. Eibeshitz, Jehoshua; Eibeshitz, Anna (eds.). Ruthka: A Diary of War. Holocaust Library. ISBN 978-0-932351-43-2.
- Kalman Linkimer Linkimer, Kalman (November 19, 2011). Anders, Edward (ed.). 19 Months in a Cellar: How 11 Jews Eluded Hitler's Henchmen. Translated by Margolis, Rebecca. Lulu.com. ISBN 978-0-932351-43-2.
- Rywka Lipszyc (1929–1945?): Lipszyc, Rywka (2014). Zapruder, Alexandra (ed.). The Diary of Rywka Lipszyc. Jewish Family and Children's Services Holocaust Center.
- Lolek Lubiński [pl] (1923-1944): Lubiński, Lolek (2015). The diary of Lolek Lubiński. Muzeum Miasta Łodzi. ISBN 9788387434991.
- Jacques Lusseyran (1924–1971): Lusseyran, Jacques (2014). And There Was Light: The Extraordinary Memoir of a Blind Hero of the French Resistance in World War II. Translated by Cameron, Elizabeth R. New World Library. ISBN 978-1-60868-269-0.
- Ruth Maier (1920–1942): Maier, Ruth (2009). Vold, Jan Erik (ed.). Ruth Maier's Diary: A Young Girl's Life Under Nazism. Translated by Bulloch, Jamie. Harvill Secker. ISBN 978-1-84655-214-4.
- Moshe Maltz (1902-1993): Maltz, Moshe (1993). Years of Horror, Glimpse of Hope: The Diary of a Family in Hiding. Shengold. ISBN 9780884001683.
- Fred Marcus (1924-2002): Marcus, Fred (2008). Marcus, Audrey Friedman (ed.). Survival in Shanghai: The Journals of Fred Marcus 1939-49. Translated by Krasno, Rena. Pacific View Press. ISBN 9781881896296.
- Philip Mechanicus (1889–1944): Mechanicus, Philip (1967). Year of Fear: A Jewish Prisoner Waits for Auschwitz. Hawthorn Books.
- Baruch Milch (1907-1989) Milch, Baruch (2003). Can Heaven be Void?. Yad Vashem. ISBN 9653081764.
- Séndi Miller
- Halina Nelken (1924-2009) Nelken, Halina (2001). And Yet, I Am Here!. Translated by Nitecki, Alicia. University of Massachusetts Press. ISBN 1558492925.
- Ana Novac: Novac, Ana (September 15, 1997). The Beautiful Days of My Youth: My Nine Months In Auschwitz. Henry Holt and Company (BYR). ISBN 9780805050189.
- Rozina Asser Pardo Pardo, Rosina Asser (2006). 548 Days With Another Name: Salonika 1943: A Child's Diary, An Adult's Memories of War. Translated by Argyriades, Demetrios. Bloch Publishing Company. ISBN 0819707686.
- Sam Pivnik
- Egon Redlich (1916–1944): Redlich, Egon (1999). Friedman, Saul S. (ed.). The Terezin Diary of Gonda Redlich. Translated by Kutler, Laurence. University Press of Kentucky. ISBN 978-0-8131-0960-2.
- Ilse Reiner: Reiner, Ilse. Through the Eyes of a Child: Diary of an Eleven Year Old Jewish Girl (2006 ed.). Xlibris. ISBN 9781425738310.
- Magda Riederman Schloss (1920–2015): Schloss, Magda Riederman. We Were Strangers: The Story of Magda Preiss.
- Oskar Rosenfeld (1884–1944): Rosenfeld, Oskar (2002). Loewy, Hanno (ed.). In the Beginning Was the Ghetto: Notebooks from Lodz. Northwestern University Press. ISBN 978-0-8101-1488-3.
- Eva Roubickova (1921-2013): Roubickova, Eva (1998). We're Alive and Life Goes On: A Theresienstadt Diary. Translated by Alexander, Zaia. Henry Holt and Co. (BYR). ISBN 9781627798952.
- Elisheva Rubinstein (1900-1944) Rubinstein, Elisheva (Elka) (2020). So that You Know: A Diary from Lwów, September 1943-February 1944. Yad Vashem. ISBN 9789653086159.
- Dawid Rubinowicz (1927–1942): Rubinowicz, Dawid (1982). The Diary of Dawid Rubinowicz. Translated by Bowman, Derek. Creative Options Publishing. ISBN 978-0-938106-03-6.
- Yitskhok Rudashevski (1927–1943): Rudashevski, Yitskhok (November 7, 2024). The Rudashevski Diary. Black Incorporated. ISBN 9781760645403. Rudashevski, Yitskhok (1973). The Diary of the Vilna Ghetto: June 1941–April 1943. Translated by Matenko, Percy. Ghetto Fighters' House. ISBN 978-0-89604-076-2.
- Kazimierz Sakowicz (1894–1944) Sakowicz, Kazimierz (2005). Arad, Yitzhak (ed.). Ponary Diary, 1941-1943: A Bystander's Account of a Mass Murder. Translated by Weinbaum, Laurence. Yale University Press. ISBN 0300108532.
- Mihail Sebastian (1907-1945): Sebastian, Mihail (November 30, 2012). Journal 1935–1944: The Fascist Years. Bloomsbury Academic. ISBN 9781442220249.
- Sarah Selver-Urbach: Selver-Urbach, Sarah (1986). Through the Window of My Home: Recollections from the Lodz Ghetto. Translated by Bodansky, Siona. Yad Vashem.
- Dawid Sierakowiak (1924–1943): Sierakowiak, Dawid (1998). Adelson, Alan (ed.). The Diary of Dawid Sierakowiak: Five Notebooks from the Lodz Ghetto. Translated by Turowski, Kamil. Oxford University Press. ISBN 978-0-19-512285-5.
- Philip Slier (1923–1943): Slier, Philip (2008). Slier, Deborah (ed.). Hidden Letters. Star Bright Books. ISBN 978-1-887734-88-2.
- Renia Spiegel (1924–1942): Spiegel, Renia (2019). Renia's Diary: A Holocaust Journal. St. Martin's Press. ISBN 978-1-250-24402-4.
- Ephraim Sten (1928-2004): Sten, Ephaim (2006). 1111 Days in My Life Plus Four. Dryad Press. ISBN 9781928755081.
- Jerzy Feliks Urman (1932–1943): Rudolf, Anthony, ed. (2016). I'm Not Even a Grown-up: the Diary and Diary Fragments of Jerzy Feliks Urman; May the Blood: the Diary of (and Other Texts By) Sophie Urman; The Aktion is Over: the Testimony of Izydor Urman. Shearsman Books. ISBN 9781848613690.
- Hilde Verdoner-Sluizer (1909–1944): Verdoner-Sluizer, Hilde (1990). Verdoner, Yoka; Verdoner Kan, Francisca (eds.). Signs of Life: The Letters of Hilde Verdoner-Sluizer from Nazi Transit Camp Westerbork, 1942–1944. Acropolis Books. ISBN 978-0-87491-955-4.
- Hersh Wasser (1912-1980): Wasser, Hersh (1983). Daily Entries of Hersh Wasser.
- Béla Weichherz (1892–1942): Weichherz, Béla (2008). Magilow, Daniel H. (ed.). In Her Father's Eyes: A Childhood Extinguished by the Holocaust. Rutgers University Press. ISBN 978-0-8135-4376-5.
- Pavel Weiner (1931-2010): Weiner, Pavel (2012). Weiner, Karen (ed.). A Boy in Terezín: The Private Diary of Pavel Weiner, April 1944–April 1945. Northwestern University Press. ISBN 9781928755081.
- Éva Weinmann (1928-1946): Weinmann, Éva (2004). Diary of Eva Weinmann: 10 October 1941 - 19 January 1945. Lauder Javne Iskola Judaisztikai Archívum. ISBN 9789632141190.
- Helga Weiss Weiss, Helga (April 22, 2013). Helga's Diary. W. W. Norton. ISBN 9780393077971.
- Aaron Wilf Wilf, Aaron (1994). The Diary of Aaron Wilf: The Blood Soaked Saga of Skole. Translated by Posner, Raphael.
- Chaim Yitzchok Wolgelernter (1911–1944): Wolgelernter, Chaim Yitzchok (2015). The Unfinished Diary: A Chronicle of Tears. Israel Bookshop Publications. ISBN 978-1-60091-065-4.
- Shalom Yoran
- Gertrude Zeisler (1889–1942): Zeisler, Gertrude (2012). Nie przeżyłam: listy z getta w Kielcach = I did not survive: letters from the Kielce Ghetto (in Polish and English).
