= Rutka Laskier =

Jewish Polish diarist died in Auschwitz

Ruth Laskier
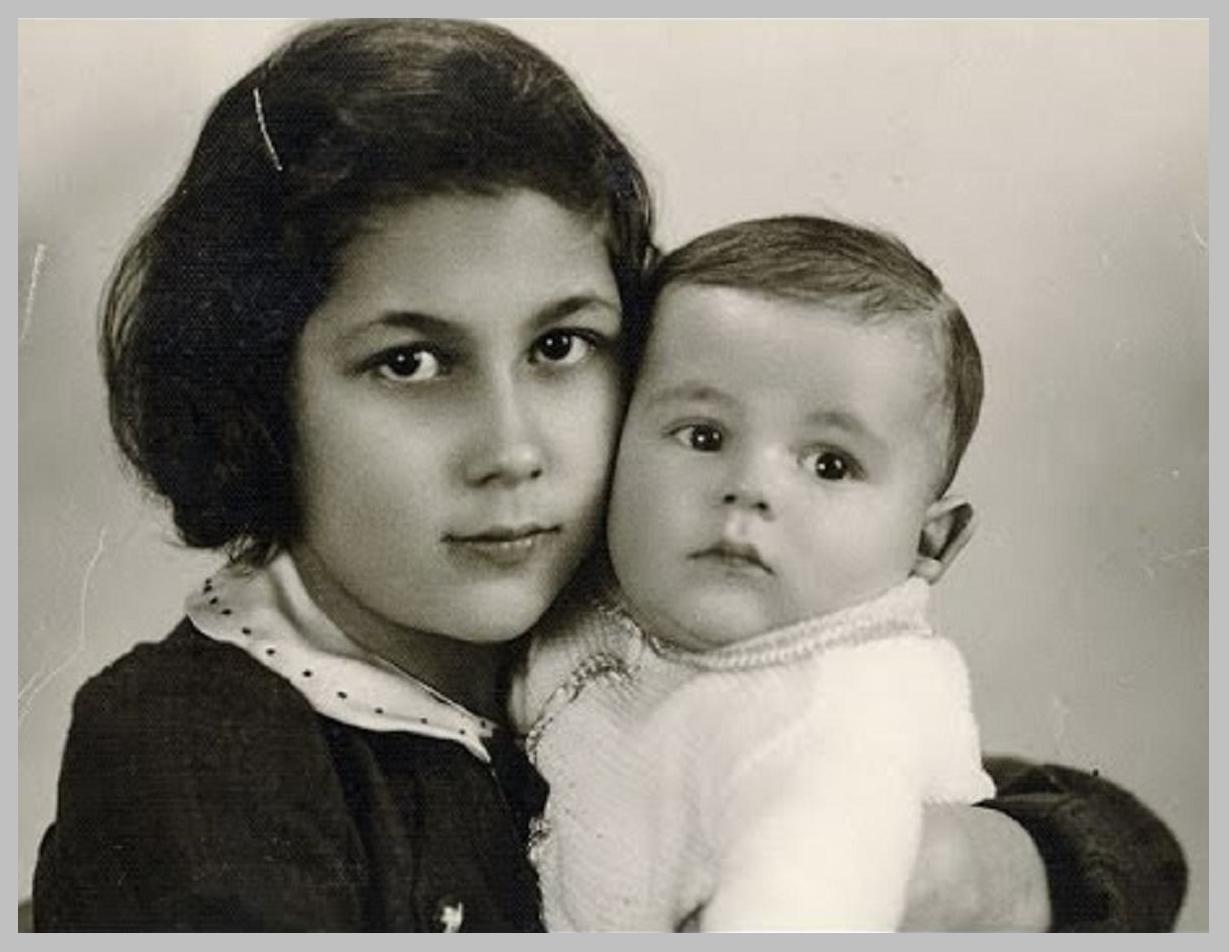
- Rutka (left) and Heniuś Laskier
- Born: Ruth Laskier; 12 June 1929; Kraków
- Died: December 1943 (aged 14); Auschwitz-Birkenau, German-occupied Poland
- Resting place: Auschwitz concentration camp, Oświęcim, Poland
- Occupation: Diarist
- Writing career
- Notable work: Pamiętnik Rutki Laskier (Rutka Laskier's Diary)

Ruth "Rutka" Laskier (12 June 1929 – December 1943) was a Jewish Polish diarist who is best known for her 1943 diary chronicling three months of her life during the Holocaust in Poland. She was murdered at Auschwitz concentration camp in 1943 at the age of fourteen. Her manuscript, authenticated by Yad Vashem, was published in the Polish language in early 2006. English and Hebrew translations were released the following year. It has been compared to the diary of Anne Frank.

Laskier's diary has been a focus of a 2009 BBC documentary and of the 2024 musical Rutka.

== Biography ==
Rutka Laskier was born in Kraków to Dwojra Hampel, daughter of Abram Chil Hampel, and Jakub Laskier, who worked as a bank officer. Her family was well-off. Her grandfather served as co-owner of Laskier-Kleinberg & Co, a milling company that owned and operated a grist mill. She attended the Furstenberg Gymnasium, at the time a private school for Jewish students.

In 1933, the municipal government in Danzig, where the Laskier family lived, was taken over by the German Nazi Party (NSDAP). It quickly began to engage in anti-Semitic violence and state-sponsored discrimination. Many Jews were fired from their positions and fled Danzig.

Rutka moved with her family to the southern Polish city of Będzin, whence her paternal grandparents hailed. Following the German invasion of Poland, while in the Będzin Ghetto, Rutka Laskier, age 14, wrote a 60-page diary in Polish, chronicling several months of her life under the Nazi rule in 1943. Her diary remained in the hands of Rutka's surviving friend for 64 years and was not released to the public until 2005.

=== The Holocaust ===
Laskier's family was forced to move to the newly formed Jewish Ghetto in Będzin during the Holocaust in World War II. Rutka was deported from the ghetto and was believed to have been murdered in a gas chamber, age 14, along with her mother and brother, upon arrival with her family at the Auschwitz concentration camp in August 1943.

However, when her diary appeared in a book, it was revealed in 2008 that she was not sent to the gas chambers along with them. Zofia Minc (later Galler), a fellow prisoner who survived, revealed in a published account of her time at Auschwitz, that Laskier slept in the barrack next to her until falling victim to a cholera outbreak in December 1943. Another prisoner pushed Laskier, still alive, in a wheelbarrow to an underground gas chamber. According to Zahava Scherz, Israeli-born daughter of Rutka's father by his subsequent marriage, Rutka begged Zofia to take her to the electric fence so she could kill herself, but an SS guard following them would not allow it. Rutka was then taken directly to the crematory.

Rutka's father was the only member of the family who survived the Holocaust. Following World War II, he emigrated to Israel, where he remarried and had another daughter, Zahava Scherz. He died in 1986. According to Zahava Scherz, interviewed in the BBC documentary The Secret Diary of the Holocaust (broadcast in January 2009), he never told Scherz about Rutka until she discovered a photo album when she herself was 14, which contained a picture of Rutka with her younger brother. Scherz asked her father who they were, and he answered her truthfully, but never spoke of it again. She went on to explain that she only learned of the existence of Rutka's diary in 2006, and she expressed how much it has meant to her to be able to get to know her half-sister through Rutka's words.

== Diary ==
From 19 January to 24 April 1943, without her family's knowledge, Laskier kept a diary in an ordinary school notebook, writing in both ink and pencil, making entries sporadically. In it, she discussed atrocities she witnessed committed by the Nazis, and described daily life in the ghetto, as well as innocent teenage love interests. She also wrote about the gas chambers at the concentration camps, indicating that the horrors of the camps had filtered back to those still living in the ghettos.

The diary begins on 19 January with the entry "I cannot grasp that it is already 1943, four years since this hell began." One of the final entries says "If only I could say, it's over, you die only once... But I can't, because despite all these atrocities, I want to live, and wait for the following day."

Laskier describes how her faith in God had suffered, writing "The little faith I used to have has been completely shattered. If God existed, He would have certainly not permitted that human beings be thrown alive into furnaces, and the heads of little toddlers be smashed with gun butts or shoved into sacks and gassed to death."

== Discovery of the diary ==
In 1943, while writing the diary, Laskier shared it with Stanisława Sapińska (21 years old, at that time), whom she had befriended after Laskier's family moved into a home owned by Sapińska's Roman Catholic family, which had been confiscated by the Nazis so that it could be included in the ghetto.

Laskier gradually came to realise she would not survive, and, realizing the importance of her diary as a document of what had happened to the Jewish population of Będzin, asked Sapińska to help her hide the diary. Sapińska showed Laskier how to hide the diary in her house under the double flooring in a staircase, between the first and second floors.

After the ghetto was evacuated and all its inhabitants sent to the death camp, Sapińska returned to the house and retrieved the diary. She kept it in her home library for 63 years and did not share it with anyone but members of her immediate family. In 2005, Adam Szydłowski, the chairman of the Center of Jewish Culture of the Zagłębie Region of Poland, was told by one of Sapińska's nieces about the existence of the diary.

With help from Sapińska's nephew, he obtained a photocopy of the diary and was instrumental in the publishing of its Polish-language edition. Its publication by Yad Vashem Publications was commemorated with a ceremony in Jerusalem by Yad Vashem (the Holocaust Martyrs' and Heroes' Remembrance Authority), Israel's Holocaust museum, on 4 June 2007, in which Zahava Scherz took part. At this ceremony, Sapińska also donated the original diary to Yad Vashem.

The diary was authenticated by Yad Vashem. It has been compared to the diary of Anne Frank, the best known Holocaust-era diary. Coincidentally, Rutka Laskier was born the same day as Anne Frank, and, in both cases, of their entire families, only their fathers survived the war.

=== Publication of the diary ===
The manuscript, as edited by Stanisław Bubin, was published in the Polish language by Polkapresse in early 2006. In June 2007, Yad Vashem Publications published English and Hebrew translations of the diary, entitled Rutka's Notebook: January–April 1943.

== Printings ==
- Laskier, Rutka (2006). Pamiętnik Rutki Laskier (Rutka Laskier's Diary). Katowice, Poland; ISBN 978-83-89956-42-2.
- Laskier, Rutka (2007). Rutka's Notebook: January–April 1943. Foreword by Dr Zahava Sherz; historical introduction by Dr Bella Gutterman. Jerusalem, Israel: Yad Vashem Publications.

== Adaptations ==
- Laskier's diary is the focus of the 2009 BBC One documentary The Secret Diary of the Holocaust
- The musical Rutka is based on Laskier's diary.

== See also ==
=== Teenaged Holocaust diarists ===
- Hélène Berr - a French diarist
- Hana Brady (aka Hana "Hanička" Bradyová) - subject of the children's book Hana's Suitcase
- Helga Deen – wrote a diary in Herzogenbusch concentration camp (Camp Vught)
- Anne Frank - a Jewish holocaust victim; author of The Diary of a Young Girl
- Renia Spiegel - a Jewish diarist in Poland
- Etty Hillesum – wrote a diary in Amsterdam and Camp Westerbork (Etty Hillesum and the Flow of Presence: A Voegelinian Analysis)
- Věra Kohnová - a Czech diarist
- David Koker - wrote a diary in Herzogenbusch concentration camp

=== Other ===
- List of posthumous publications of Holocaust victims
- List of Holocaust diarists
- List of diarists
- List of Poles
- Janet Langhart
- Sam Pivnik
- Rainer Maria Rilke
- Tanya Savicheva
- Calel Perechodnik - Polish Jewish ghetto policeman who wrote a memoir, Am I a Murderer?
- Henio Zytomirski - Polish Jewish victim of the Holocaust (Letters to Henio)
