= Melania Fogelbaum =

Polish poet and painter

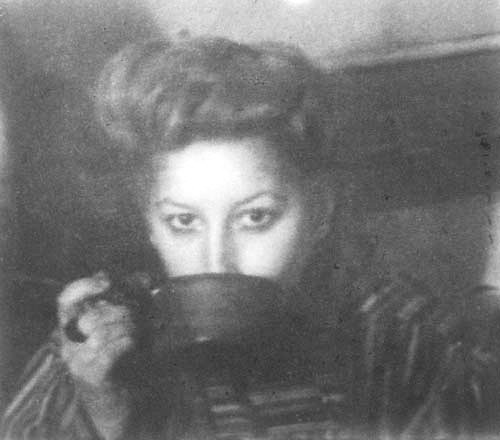
- Born: June 11, 1911; Łódź, Poland
- Died: August 1, 1944 (aged 33); Auschwitz concentration camp
- Known for: poetry and artwork created in the Łódź Ghetto

Melania Fogelbaum (1911–1944) was a Polish poet, sculptor and painter who died in the Holocaust. She was born in Łódź, Poland, to Cyla Fogelbaum (1874–1942).

== Łódź Ghetto ==
Fogelbaum lived with her mother Cyla on Marynarska Street in the Łódź Ghetto as of 1940. Cyla died on February 25, 1942. Melania worked in the ghetto's Scientific Department. She caught tuberculosis and was unable to meet the work targets enforced by the Nazis. In this dire situation, fellow ghetto prisoners shared their own limited rations with Fogelbaum. She was deported to Auschwitz-Birkenau on August 1, 1944, and killed soon after arrival.

== Art and influence ==
A manuscript of Fogelbaum's writings, written in Polish using pencil, was discovered in the rubble of the depopulated Łódź ghetto. Nachman Zonabend, working in the prisoner commando that was clearing the former ghetto, discovered two notebooks containing poems, notes and two photographs by Melania Fogelbaum. Helena Zymler, one of Fogelbaum's friends, included several poems by Melania in a post-war anthology and she donated the notebooks and photographs to the United States Holocaust Memorial Museum in Washington in 1998.

== See also ==
- Samuel Bak
- Arnold Daghani
- Rywka Lipszyc
- Dawid Sierakowiak
