= Hélène Berr =

French note writer

- A photograph of Hélène Berr
- Born: 27 March 1921; Paris, France
- Died: 10 April 1945 (aged 24); Bergen-Belsen concentration camp, Lower Saxony, Nazi Germany
- Cause of death: Typhus
- Known for: Keeping a diary during the Nazi-occupied Europe

Hélène Berr (27 March 1921 – 10 April 1945) was a French Jewish woman, who documented her life in a diary during the time of Nazi occupation of France. In France she is considered to be a "French Anne Frank". She died from typhus during an epidemic of the disease in Bergen-Belsen concentration camp that also killed Anne Frank and her sister Margot.

== Life ==
Hélène Berr was born in 1921 in Paris, France, to a French-Jewish family.

On 10 May 1940, Nazi Germany invaded France, the Netherlands, Belgium, and Luxembourg. All four countries surrendered to Nazi Germany. On 23 June, and the German occupation of France began. Persecution of the Jews began shortly after the start of the occupation. The Nazis made wearing the yellow "Star of David" badge mandatory for the Jews. In March 1942, the Nazis began deporting Jews to concentration camps. As the persecution and deportation of the Jews increased in 1943, Hélène and her family no longer felt safe in their apartment at 5 Avenue Élisée-Reclus, just blocks from the Eiffel Tower. In March of that year, Hélène and her parents began staying most nights with friends to avoid the raids being conducted by the Nazis and Vichy police. Risking one night at their own flat, Hélène and her parents were arrested on the morning of March 8, 1944. After incarceration at the Drancy relocation camp just east of Paris for almost three weeks, she and her family were deported to Auschwitz. After eight months at Auschwitz, Hélène was deported to the Bergen-Belsen concentration camp in the autumn of 1944. In the winter of 1944–45, there was a raging typhus epidemic in the camp, causing Berr to get typhus, and become very ill and weak. After the winter passed, she was ill and weak to the point that she could no longer stand or walk. There was a roll call in the camp, which Berr failed to attend, given her condition and illness. Because she did not attend the roll call, she was severely beaten by a Nazi officer, thus making her weaker. She died on 10 April 1945 from typhus in the camp, five days prior to its liberation by the British and American army.

== Diary ==
Berr kept her diary from 7 April 1942, until 15 February 1944.

== Publication ==
In the concentration camps, Berr met some of her friends and told them that she wanted to publish her diary after the war ended. Berr's boyfriend, Morawiecki, who survived the war, became a diplomat. In November 1992, Hélène Berr's niece, Mariette Job, decided to track down Morawiecki with a view to publishing the diary. He gave the journal that consists of 262 single pages to Job in April 1994. The diary has been stored at Paris' Mémorial de la Shoah (Holocaust Memorial Museum) since 2002.

The book was published in France in January 2008. The Libération paper declared it as "the editorial event at the beginning of 2008" and reminded the readers of the lively discussions about the book of Ukrainian Jewish novelist Irène Némirovsky. The first print of 24,000 copies was sold out after only two days.

== Exhibition ==
Opening of the exhibit "Hélène Berr, A Stolen Life - Exhibition from Mémorial de la Shoah, Paris France", was held at the Alliance Française d'Atlanta in Atlanta, Georgia USA, on 22 January 2014. Speakers included the Consuls General of France and Germany, Directors of the Alliance Française and the Goethe-Zentrum as well as the executive directors of the Memorial de la Shoah, Paris and the Georgia Commission on the Holocaust.

== See also ==
- The Diary of Hélène Berr
- List of Holocaust diarists
- List of diarists
- List of posthumous publications of Holocaust victims
- Hana Brady - Jewish girl and Holocaust victim; subject of the children's book Hana's Suitcase
- Helga Deen - Dutch Jewish diarist; kept a diary in Herzogenbusch concentration camp (Camp Vught)
- Anne Frank - Jewish author of The Diary of a Young Girl
- Etty Hillesum - Dutch Jewish diarist and Holocaust victim; kept a diary in Amsterdam and in the Westerbork concentration camp
- Etty Hillesum and the Flow of Presence: A Voegelinian Analysis
- Věra Kohnová - Czech Jewish diarist and Holocaust victim
- David Koker - wrote a diary in Herzogenbusch concentration camp (Camp Vught)
- Janet Langhart - writer of a one act play, Anne and Emmett
- Rutka Laskier - Polish Jewish diarist and Holocaust victim
- Sam Pivnik - Polish Jewish Holocaust survivor, author and memoirist
- Rainer Maria Rilke - German poet who influenced her thoughts and diary writings.
- Tanya Savicheva
- Sophie Scholl - German student executed by the Nazis
- Henio Zytomirski - Polish Jewish Holocaust victim
