= Miriam Chaszczewacki =

Holocaust victim

- Born: September 1924; Radomsko, Poland
- Died: October 1942 (aged 18)
- Occupation: student
- Known for: Holocaust diarist and victim

Miriam Chaszczewacki or Miriam Chaszczewacka (October 1924–October 1942) was a Jewish girl and Holocaust victim who in 1939 began writing a personal diary about her life. The diary covered events between September 1939 up until shortly before Miriam's death in October 1942. Between October 9 and October 12, 1942, the Jews in the Radomsko ghetto were deported to the Treblinka Extremination Camp and they met their deaths there.

Miriam's diary survived the war and was given to Stefania Heilbrunn, Miriam's former teacher and one of the few Jews who survived and returned to Radomsko. A quote from the diary is included on the mezzanine in the "Holocaust" gallery at the POLIN Museum of the History of Polish Jews. The diary is also a major source of information for the Yizkhor book for Radomsko.

== Life ==
Miriam's mother, Sarah Lavit Zelber, born to a Hassidic family, was a kindergarten teacher. Miriam's father, David, arrived in Radomsko as a refugee from Volhynia in after the Russian Revolution. About a third of Radomsko's prewar population of 28,000 was Jewish. The family spoke Polish at home and were traditional Jews with Zionist views. Sarah ran a Jewish kindergarten, one of only two in Radomsko, which was next door to the Chaszczewacki family home. Sarah also taught Hebrew and Jewish history to older students. The family, supported mainly by Sarah's school, was poor.

Miriam's brother Nahum was born in 1929. Miriam graduated from a state primary school and was a 15-year-old gymnasium student and a member of a Zionist youth movement when the war began. She is described as a gentle, sensitive, intelligent and talented girl; she was advanced in her Hebrew studies. In another testimony, she is described as a shy, romantic and dreamy teenager.

Miriam's father and brother were murdered in the ghetto by the Germans. She and her mother survived in hiding for almost two weeks, until hunger made them surrender.

== Chapters of the diary ==
The diary begins with the introductory chapter that starts, "Every beginning is difficult," and describes the events between the spring of 1939 and the occupation of Radomsko by the Germans in September 1939. She wrote that the summer holidays in 1939 "dragged along slowly. We complained of boredom and resented having to spend summer in town. People were afraid to travel, in case they might be trapped away from home." Radomsko was one of the first ghettos in occupied Poland.

The second part of the diary consists of 27 dated entries starting on April 21, 1941 describing the events of the war and ghetto life, with the hunger and deportations, along with the typical account of a teenage girl's emotions. She was part of a Zionist organization in the ghetto, but it had to dissolve itself for safety reasons. On May 13 she wrote, "Letters from everywhere bring gruesome news. In Warsaw--every day a harvest of corpses. The abyss yawns deeper and deeper each day..." In April 1942, her brother Nachum turned thirteen and the family celebrated his bar mitzvah. The Nazis had made education illegal, so Miriam and her friends attended clandestine classes in the ghetto, using prewar Polish textbooks. She took lessons in shorthand and English, and studied the poetry of Adam Asnyk. Sarah still ran the nursery school inside the ghetto, and Miriam helped her.

In June 1942, Miriam wrote about the execution of several people who had been caught with fur coats, after the deadline when the Nazis had ordered Jews to hand in all their furs. "There were two couples, both related," she wrote. "Both left small children. I haven't the moment to describe that day and the prevailing mood. If only this were all!" After the execution of a girl she knew, she wrote, "Trapped in a cage, with no way out, daily subjected to cruelty and bestiality--and yet we go on living. Who knows--we might even survive..."

By September, Miriam was no longer optimistic, as 5,000 people had been deported from Radomsko to Treblinka. She wrote, "I ought to take a farewell from my diary. It sounds idiotic and schoolgirlish, but for all I know I might be writing in it for the last time." She knew about the deportations of Jews throughout the General Government and the terrible conditions the deportees were traveling under. Her family was delivered an envelope, written from inside a cattle truck by one of her uncles. "The same fate awaits us," Miriam commented, "except that there will be nobody left for us to write a letter to." Her last entry was on October 7, 1942; she wrote, "I am using the time that is left to us."

== Death ==
Miriam's father David Chaszczewacki was shot by a German gendarme in Dolna Street when he refused to board a deportation train. A witness said he shouted at the gendarmes, "Shoot, you animals, I'm not moving from here!" They dragged him to the gate, shot him there and left his body draped over the gate. Nahum was also killed during the mass deportation of the Radomsko Jews, unburied body was found at the Jewish cemetery after the war. No one in Miriam's family survived.

The last entry in the diary in Miriam's handwriting was on October 7, 1942, when Miriam was 18. Between October 9 and 12, 1942 almost all of the about 14,000 residents of the ghetto were sent to Treblinka. In the last page of the notebook appears an entry in a different handwriting, possibly by the Polish policeman who was the son of the woman who passed the notebook to Stefania Heilbrunn after the war:

On the evening of the 24 October 1942 she surrendered, together with her mother, to a Polish policeman on duty on Limanewskeigo Str. They asked to be taken to the Judenrat, as they have been hiding for a week in a lavatory and had enough of it all. During the last 3 days they ate raw groats. They were taken to the Police station and the next day left with a transport by lorry to Częstochowa.

In one of the diary's last entries, about a month before her death, Miriam wrote:

It may seem silly, but only a step away from death I still worry about my diary. I would not want for it to meet a miserable end in an oven or on a rubbish heap. I wish somebody could find it – even if it be only a German – and would read it. I wish that these scribblings, though they record barely a fraction of the cruelties, would one day serve as a true and faithful document of our times.

== Discovery and publication of the diary ==
Miriam's teacher Stefania Heilbrunn returned to Radomsko, Poland after World War II had ended. While she was visiting the city cemetery, she met a Polish woman who gave her a sealed envelope saying: "My son has asked me to give this to you. I don't know anything about it," and left. In the envelope Heilbrunn found a notebook with handwriting she recognized as belonging to her former student, Miriam Chaszczewacki. Heilbrunn brought the notebook to Israel and published the diary.

Originally the diary was written in Polish. Parts of the diary had been published in Hebrew, Yiddish, Polish, English and German. The original notebook was donated to Yad Vashem. It is in print in English under the title Children of Dust and Heaven: A Diary from Nazi Occupation through the Holocaust; the diary is included in this volume alongside recollections from Heilbrunn and other ghetto survivors.

== See also ==
- List of Holocaust diarists
- List of diarists
- Dawid Sierakowiak
- Rywka Lipszyc
