= Dawid Rubinowicz =

Polish writer

Dawid Rubinowicz (born 27 July 1927 in Krajno, Poland, died 1942 in the Treblinka extermination camp) was a Polish Jew and diarist who was murdered in the Holocaust. His diary was found and published after the end of World War II.

== Life ==
Dawid Rubinowicz grew up with two younger siblings in Krajno, a village in central Poland near Kielce which counted seven Jewish families before the war. David’s father ran a small dairy farm. In 1933 Dawid started school. He was a good student and the testimony books from those years have been preserved. In May 1937 the only surviving photo was taken with Dawid Rubinowicz, a class photo. There are no other written documents from this period, only the memories of his teacher Florentyna Krogulcowa and his classmate Tadeusz Janicki.

After Nazi Germany's invasion of Poland in 1939, Rubinowicz was no longer allowed to attend school. His teacher met his mother in secret, gave her assignments and corrected the boy's exercise books. She also advised the boy to keep a diary. Dawid was twelve years old when he started his diary on 21 March 1940. From then on he wrote down in five exercise books what he encountered and what moved him. In the first year briefly and at large intervals, then more and more frequently and in greater detail, the sensitive boy described the measures taken by the Germans and documented the mechanisms of totalitarian arbitrariness and violence with terrifying accuracy.

In March 1942 the Rubinowicz family had to leave Krajno. In Bodzentyn, where around a thousand Jews lived before the war, Jews from all over the area were now crammed together. They lived in unspeakable conditions. Hundreds died of starvation and disease. Every day people were shot or taken to forced labor camps like Dawid's father.

In mid-September 1942, the Jews were herded into the Bodzentyn market square, which was intended as the assembly point. The next day the long procession of the doomed left for Suchedniów. There they were loaded into cattle trucks on 21 September 1942, on Yom Kippur. Dawid's last journey ended, it must be assumed, after the arrival of the "Special Train for Resettlers" Pkr 9228 in the morning of the next day in the Treblinka extermination camp.

== The diary ==
In August 1957, Dawid's notebooks were found in an attic by Helena and Artemiusz Wołczyk. In October 1957 they began to read the diary on the local radio. In the fall of 1959, they sent Dawid's notes to the Warsaw journalist Maria Jarochowska, who immediately published them. They first appeared in January 1960 in Twórczość.

The diary immediately caused a sensation all over Poland. The writer Jarosław Iwaszkiewicz used it as an occasion to appeal to his compatriots to make all records and diaries from the time of the occupation available to the public. He wrote:

What little Dawid describes may seem incomprehensible and ghostly to some today – but it is a reflection of a reality that millions of Poles and Jews went through in those difficult years. Anyone who reads the simple words, the simple sentences of the suffering, so a personable little boy will undoubtedly say: Never again! Never again a time of human contempt, never again an era of incinerators. - From the foreword to the first German-language edition, Berlin and Warsaw 1960.

The first book edition appeared in Warsaw in the spring of 1960, and the German translation a little later. Since then, Dawid's diary has been translated into numerous languages.

=== Publications ===
- Dawid Rubinowicz: Pamiętnik Dawida Rubinowicza. Kommentare von Adam Rutkowski; Nachwort: Maria Jarochowska. Warszawa 1960.
- Dawid Rubinowicz: Das Tagebuch des Dawid Rubinowicz. Verlag Volk und Welt und Verlag Książka i Wiedza, Berlin und Warschau 1960.
- Dawid Rubinowicz: Das Tagebuch des Dawid Rubinowicz. Fischer Verlag, Frankfurt a. M. 1960.
- Dawid Rubinowicz: The diary of Dawid Rubinowicz. Translated by Derek Bowman. Blackwood, Edinburgh 1981.
- Walther Petri (Hrsg.): Das Tagebuch des Dawid Rubinowicz. Nachwort von Walther Petri. Aus dem Polnischen von Stanisław Zyliński. Der Kinderbuchverlag, Berlin 1985.
- Dawid Rubinowicz: Pamiętnik Dawida Rubinowicza. Mit einem Vorwort von Jarosław Iwaszkiewicz. Książka i Wiedza, Warszawa 1987.
- Walther Petri (Hrsg.): Das Tagebuch des Dawid Rubinowicz. Nachwort von Walther Petri. Aus dem Polnischen von Stanisław Zyliński. Mit Fotos aus dem DEFA-Dokumentarfilm Dawids Tagebuch von Walther Petri und Konrad Weiß. 5. Auflage, Beltz & Gelberg, Weinheim 2001 (Gullivers Bücher Bd. 34), ISBN 3-407-78034-6.

Further translations were made into Danish, English, Finnish, French, Hebrew, Italian, Yiddish, Dutch and Czech, among others.

=== Literature ===
- Konrad Weiß: Dawids Tagebuch. In: Die Weltbühne, Berlin, Nr. 48 vom 25. November 1980, S. 1521–1524.
- Walther Petri: Das Tagebuch des Dawid Rubinowicz. In: Neue Deutsche Literatur, Berlin und Weimar, 30. Jg., Nr. 7/1982, S. 111–113.
- Konrad Weiß: Dawids Tagebuch – Ein antifaschistischer Kinderfilm aus der DDR u. seine Rezeption. In: Pädagogik und Schule in Ost und West, Oldenburg, Jg. 37, Nr. 3/1989, S. 165–171.

=== Other media ===
- Das Tagebuch des Dawid Rubinowicz. Sprechplatte (Regie: Charlotte Niemann, Sprecher: Charles Brauer und Hans Paetsch, Gesang: Jürgen Schulz). Christophorus-Verlag, Freiburg i. Br. o. J. [1965].
- Dawids Tagebuch. Dokumentarfilm (Buch: Walther Petri und Konrad Weiß, Kamera: Michael Lösche, Regie: Konrad Weiß). DEFA Studio für Dokumentarfilm, Berlin 1980.
- I’m Still Here: Real Diaries of Young People who Lived During the Holocaust. Dokumentation (Buch: Alexandra Zapruder, Regie: Lauren Lazin). MTV News & Documentaries, New York 2005.
- bodzentyn.net | Testimonies and recollections | Dawid Rubinowicz

== See also ==
- List of Jewish ghettos in German-occupied Poland
- The Holocaust in Poland
- Rywka Lipszyc
- Yitskhok Rudashevski
- Dawid Sierakowiak
