= Molly Applebaum =

Polish-Canadian Holocaust survivor and diarist

- Born: Melania Weissenberg; October 27, 1930 (age 95); Kraków, Poland
- Known for: published a memoir of surviving the holocaust

Molly Applebaum (born Melania Weissenberg, October 27, 1930) is a Polish-Canadian Holocaust survivor and diarist. Scholars describe how her diary addressed aspects of surviving the Holocaust that usually went unaddressed.

According to Sara R. Horowitz, a Holocaust scholar, Applebaum wrote a memoir in 1998 and published an updated version when the wartime diary she maintained as a girl was returned to her around 2015. This provided scholars a rare opportunity to compare her recollection of events with her description of events recorded as they occurred.

== Biography ==
After Applebaum's mother heard rumors of conditions for Jewish people in the Nazi concentration camps, she negotiated arrangements with a farmer, named Victor Wójcjk, to hide her family on his farm. Initially, the farmer hid her mother, Applebaum, her stepfather, her little brother, and an adult cousin, Helen. However, her stepfather was not able to endure the conditions of hiding on the farm and returned to the ghetto. Her mother and little brother also returned to the ghetto, because he could not understand why he should not slip out of their hiding place and play with the farmer's children, and her mother realized his playfulness was putting all four of them at risk. Her mother, stepfather and brother did not survive the war.

Applebaum and her cousin hid in an underground chamber hardly larger than a coffin, for years. It was large enough for the two girls to lie side-by-side, but not tall enough for them to sit up. Applebaum and her cousin depended on Wójcjk for all their needs, and she describes how they would grow faint after days of not being brought any food.

Scholars observed that her diary described an aspect of the Holocaust that had been rarely addressed: sexual abuse. After she reached puberty, the farmer who was hiding her started having sexual relations with her. Applebaum recounted how she and her cousin encouraged this sexual contact out of fear that he might otherwise tire of the burden and risk of hiding them and turn them away. The farmer did not betray Applebaum and her cousin. Applebaum describes retreating German soldiers being billeted on the farm in late 1944 as Soviet forces advanced.

== Life after World War II ==
Applebaum immigrated to Canada in 1948.

Horowitz writes that Applebaum married reluctantly, in Toronto, in 1950, and had an unhappy married life. She describes Applebaum reading about abusive relationships after her husband's death, in 1983, and that this allowed her to put both her marriage and her relationship with the farmer, Wójcjk, in perspective. Her 1998 memoir did not address the sexual aspect of the girl's relationship with Victor Wójcjk, but her original diary did. So the updated version, which included the diary, revealed events that had otherwise been buried for years.

The second edition of her memoirs were shortlisted for the non-fiction category at the 2018 Vine Awards for Canadian Jewish Literature.

On October 15, 2018, the McGill Faculty of Law hosted a conference entitled Sexual Violence in the Context of the Holocaust. One of the conference session was devoted to Applebaum and her memoirs. Jan Grabowski presented the memoirs' historical context. Deborah Barton, Sophia Koukoui and Ariela Freedman provided analysis of the memoir. At another public lecture, at the University of New Brunswick Freedman called Applebaum's memoir a "doubled narrative".

== See also ==
- Mary Berg
- Anne Frank
- Lena Mukhina
- Rywka Lipsczyc
- Ruth Maier
- Yitskhok Rudashevski
- Chaim Rumkowski
- Renia Spiegel
