= Ana Novac =

Romanian writer (1929-2010)

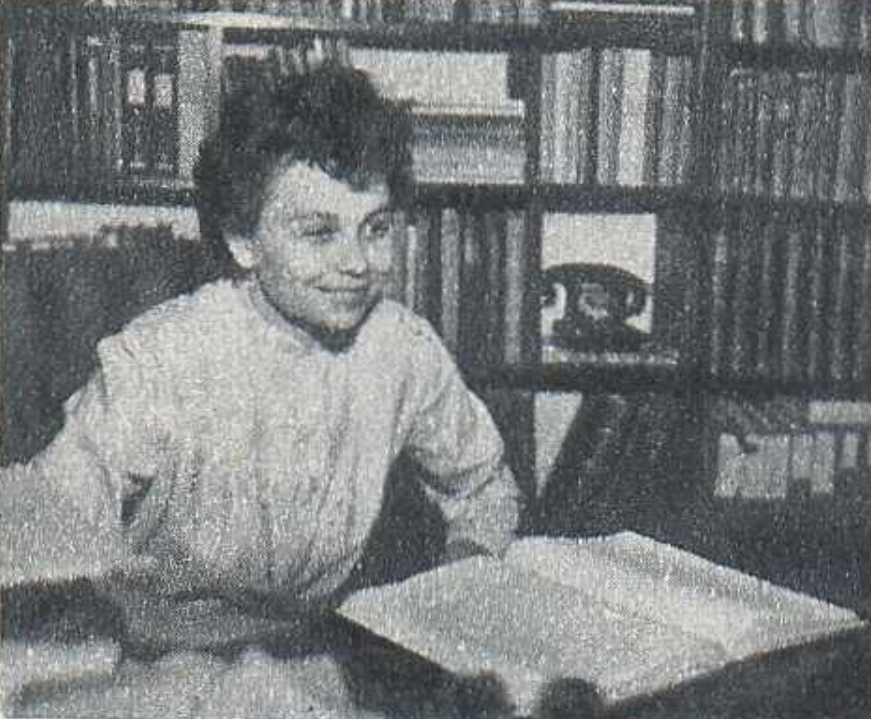
- Novac in 1957
- Born: Zimra Harsányi; June 21, 1929; Dej, Romania
- Died: March 10, 2010 (aged 80); Paris, France
- Known for: writer and Holocaust survivor

Ana Novac (June 21, 1929 – March 31, 2010) was a Romanian-born actress and writer. She was born Zimra Harsányi in Dej in northern Transylvania and grew up in Oradea (Nagyvárad). She later said, "I have never been able to specify precisely either my nationality or my native language... In three generations my family changed nationality four times."

Novac began keeping a diary at the age of eleven, writing it so often that she was prohibited from doing so any more "on the grounds that it interfered with my appetite and my sleep, to say nothing of my homework." After diary writing was no longer allowed, she "often scribbled under the desk in class, or in the bathroom". Novac began attending a Jewish boarding school in Miskolc, Hungary after Jews were expelled from state schools. She left "six big notebooks" of her diary with her concierge before she went away to boarding school.

When Nazi Germany took control of Hungary in the spring of 1944, in May, Novac was arrested while on a train home to Oradea, and never saw her family again. She and a group of other Jewish people were detained in a ghetto on the site of a brickyard, and there Novac witnessed "a rush to suicide, a veritable epidemic, which was reserved for rich, because the cyanide that people brought in--God knows how--commanded phenomenal prices". She made several attempts to escape the brickyard but was always caught and brought back.

She was sent to Auschwitz and stated she did not remember the trip, that her "first memory is of a pencil stub that I found in the sand." She was able to maintain her diary from June to November 1944, hiding pages in her shoes. When she left Auschwitz, she asked a lagerkapo for his notebook, telling him, "I am a writer." He gave the notebook and a pencil to her, and she used those for her diary. She also spent time in the Kraków-Płaszów concentration camp. At one point she had parts of the diary smuggled out of the Płaszów camp by another prisoner who was being released. She gave him the address of her family's concierge and asked him to send it to them, and he did, and she was able to recover it after the war. Another prisoner who knew about the existence of Novac's diary demanded she burn it, and she lied and said she had.

One of her friends, a woman Novac referred to only as "the sculptress", took two of the notebooks from Novac and hid them in her own boots. After they left Płaszów and were put on a train to Auschwitz, during the journey, the sculptress died. One of the last things she did was unlace her boots and say, "before it's too late," which Novac interpreted as a reference to her diary notebooks, which were inside the sculptress's boots.

During her second time in Auschwitz, she wrote in her diary that she got no work assignment at first and would "squat down anywhere with my papers and not attract anyone's attention." She found a hiding place, wrote there "little, and with difficulty", and slept there, except during roll call and bread and soup distribution times. Eventually, Novac was tattooed with the number A17587. After she went to the camp infirmary to get an infected boil drained, she found out they were gassing and cremating prisoners at Auschwitz.

She was eventually liberated by the Soviets at the Chrastava (Kratzau) labor camp in Czechoslovakia on May 6, 1945. By that time, at almost 16 years of age, she weighed 75 pounds. Her parents both died of typhus shortly after liberation, and her younger brother was apparently gassed. When she was hospitalized and confined to bed due to her poor state of health at liberation, at one point Novac thought there was going to be a selection and the ones who were too sick would be sent back to Auschwitz. She got up, found her clothes and offered to go to work. The nurse told her to get undressed, and took her blood pressure.

Novac returned to Romania and spent two years recovering in a Jewish hospital in Cluj. After she regained her health she attended the Theater Institute and then studied psychology at Bucharest, and became an actress, playwright and novelist. She moved to Berlin in 1963 and wrote dramas for German radio. When she left Romania she smuggled the diary out with her, and it was first published in 1968. After 1970 she settled in Paris.

Novac translated the diary from its original Hungarian to French, the language it was first published in. The diary has been translated into a number of languages including English, German, Italian, Dutch and Hungarian. Its English title is The Beautiful Days of My Youth: My Six Months In Auschwitz and Plaszow (1997). She also published a number of other books and plays. Novac died in Paris. In 2020, a play based on her diary debuted at the Jewish State Theater in Bucharest, Romania.

== See also ==
- Eva Heyman
- List of Holocaust diarists
- Věra Kohnová
- Séndi Miller
