= Séndi Miller =

Hungarian Jewish Holocaust survivor and diarist

- Born: Sheindi Ehrenwald; 1929; Galanta, Slovakia
- Died: October 28, 2024; Jerusalem, Israel
- Known for: Holocaust survivor who kept a diary

Séndi Miller (1929-October 28, 2024), born Sheindi Ehrenwald in the town of Galanta in a mostly Hungarian part of Slovakia. Her parents were Leopold and Cecilia Ehrenwald, who ran a wine shop together, her two older brothers were away fighting on the Eastern Front, and at home she had two sisters, Jitti and Dori, and two brothers, Rüvi and Beri. On March 19, 1944, the day Nazi Germany invaded Hungary and occupied Galanta, Miller began writing a diary.

== The Holocaust ==
In June 1944, Miller and her parents were sent to a brick factory in Nové Zámky and then in a cattle car to Auschwitz. She was fourteen years old. She was given a forced labor assignment at a factory in Lower Silesia and her parents, grandparents and two of her siblings were sent to the gas chambers. Her twelve-year-old sister Dori was taken away by Josef Mengele and did not survive. Miller continued to write as often as possible, on whatever paper material she could find, even in Auschwitz and at the arms company where she worked making grenades and bombshells. She and hid the pages in her clothing, and in the straw in her bunk bed.

== Discovery of diary ==
After the war, Miller settled in Jerusalem, Israel in 1949 where she rebuilt her life, married and had children. Four of her seven siblings had perished in the Holocaust, and her oldest son died in the Yom Kippur War. In 1998, the arms company where she'd done forced labor paid her approximately $5,000 in reparations without admitting any legal responsibility for her enslavement.

She kept her diary hidden in her kitchen cupboard for seventy years, then a friend found out about them and told reporters for the German paper Bild, which publicized her diary and story and produced a documentary short called Sheindi’s Diary. Her diary consists of 54 pages in Hungarian handwritten on dockets from the Karl Diehl arms company and small scraps of paper. It was displayed in the German Historical Museum in Berlin. Her diary and story are virtually unknown in Israel. She has stated she felt ignored by Yad Vashem, which did not express any interest in publishing her diary, and felt Holocaust research had focused on Polish Jews to the exclusion of Hungarian Jews like herself.

== See also ==
- Eva Heyman
- List of Holocaust diarists
- Věra Kohnová
- Ana Novac
