= Ruth Maier =

Austrian author and Holocaust victim (1920-1942)

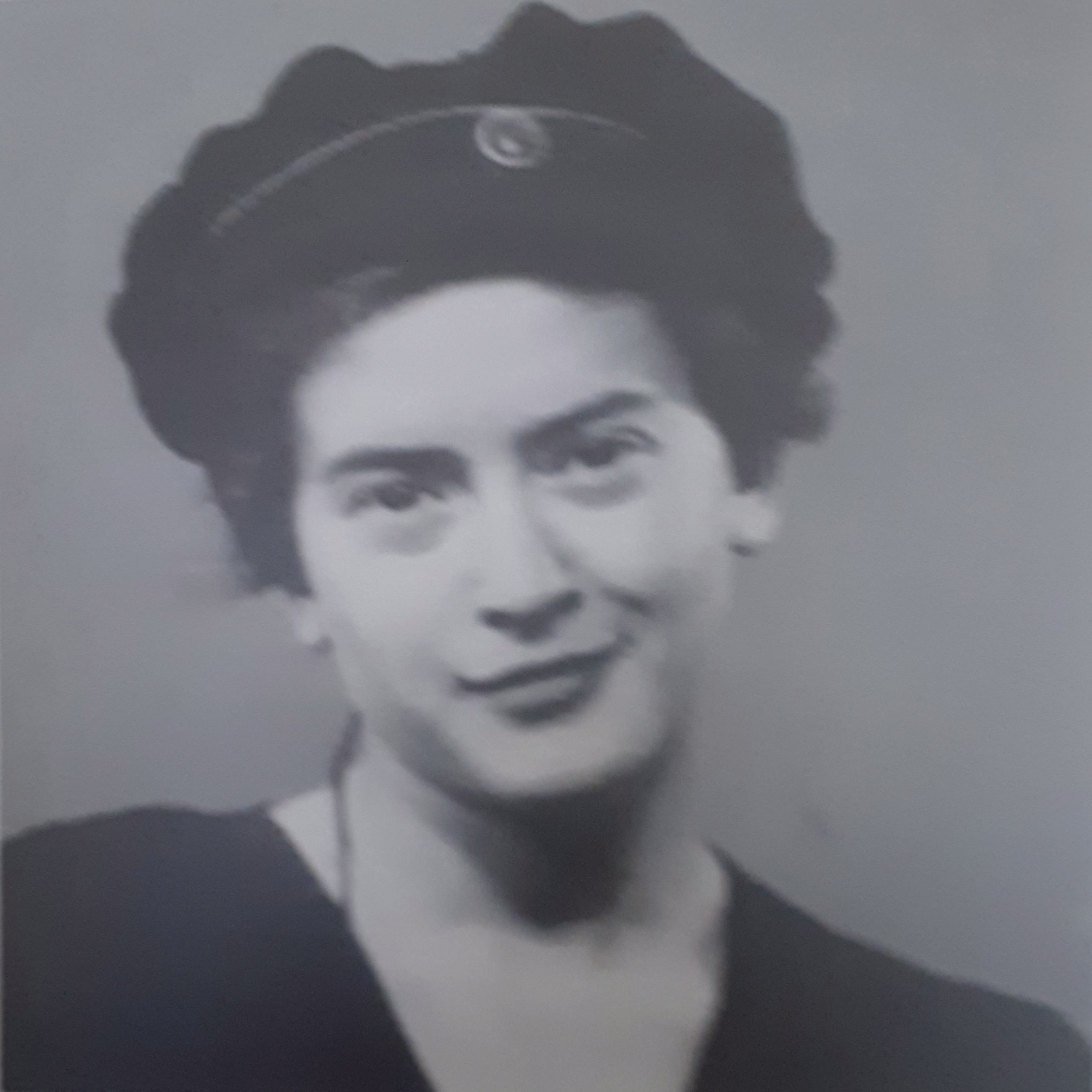
- Ruth Maier
- Born: November 10, 1920; Vienna, Austria
- Died: December 1, 1942 (aged 22); Auschwitz, German-occupied Poland

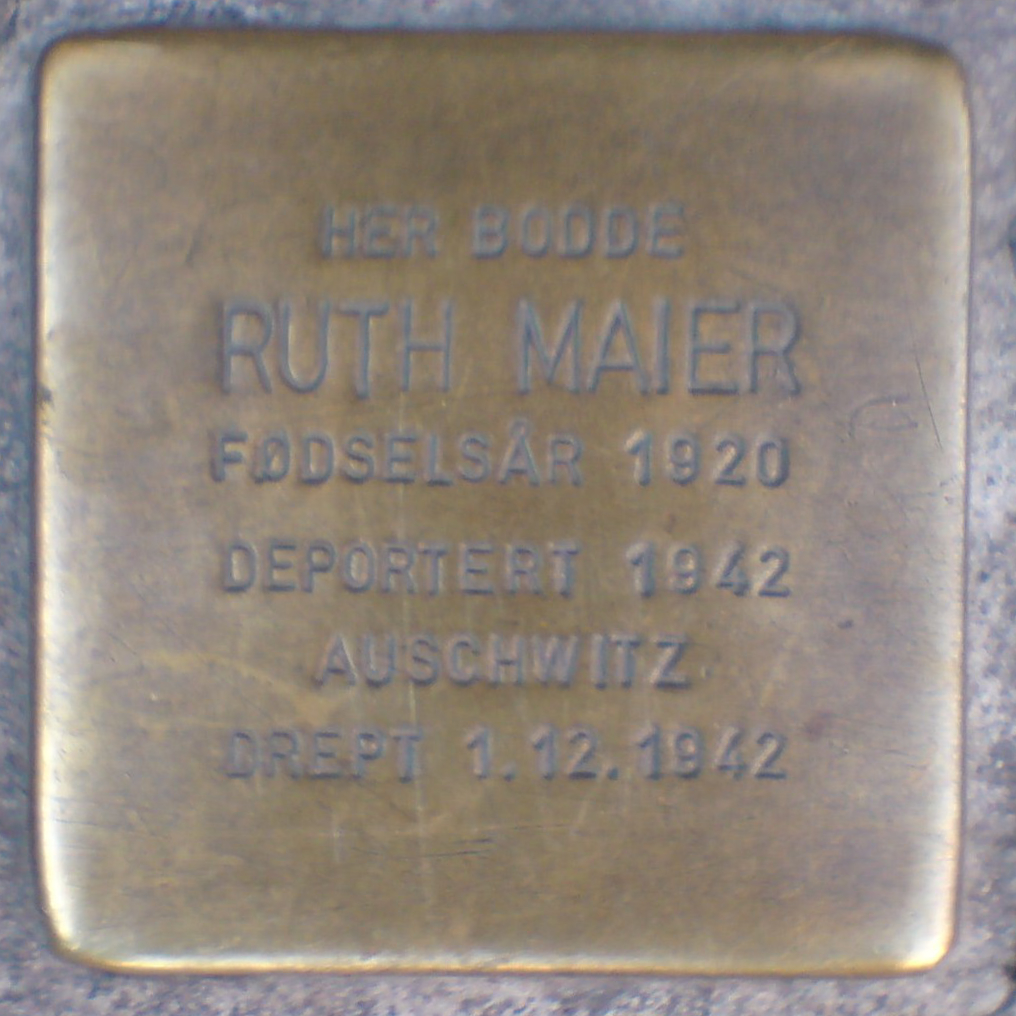
Stolperstein at Maier's last residence in Oslo

Ruth Maier (10 November 1920 in Vienna, Austria – 1 December 1942 in Auschwitz, German-occupied Poland) was an Austrian woman whose diaries describing her experiences of the Holocaust in Austria and Norway were published in 2007; reviews described her as "Norway's Anne Frank."

== Early life ==
Ruth Maier's parents Ludwig and Irma Maier

Ruth Maier was born in Vienna to a largely assimilated Jewish family daughter of Ludwig [b.1882] and Irma [1895-1964]. Her father, Dr. Ludwig Maier, held a doctorate in philosophy, was a polyglot (mastering nine languages), and held a senior position within the Austrian post and telegraph service. He died in 1933 of erysipelas. Her first cousin, who survived the war, was the philosopher Stephan Körner.

Her younger sister Judith managed to escape to the United Kingdom. Through her father's contacts, Ruth was able to find refuge in Norway, where she arrived by train on 30 January 1939. She was housed for some time with a Norwegian family. She became fluent in Norwegian within a year, completed her examen artium, and befriended the future poet Gunvor Hofmo at a volunteer work camp in Biri. The two became a couple, finding lodging and work in various places in Norway.

== Model for sculptor Gustav Vigeland ==
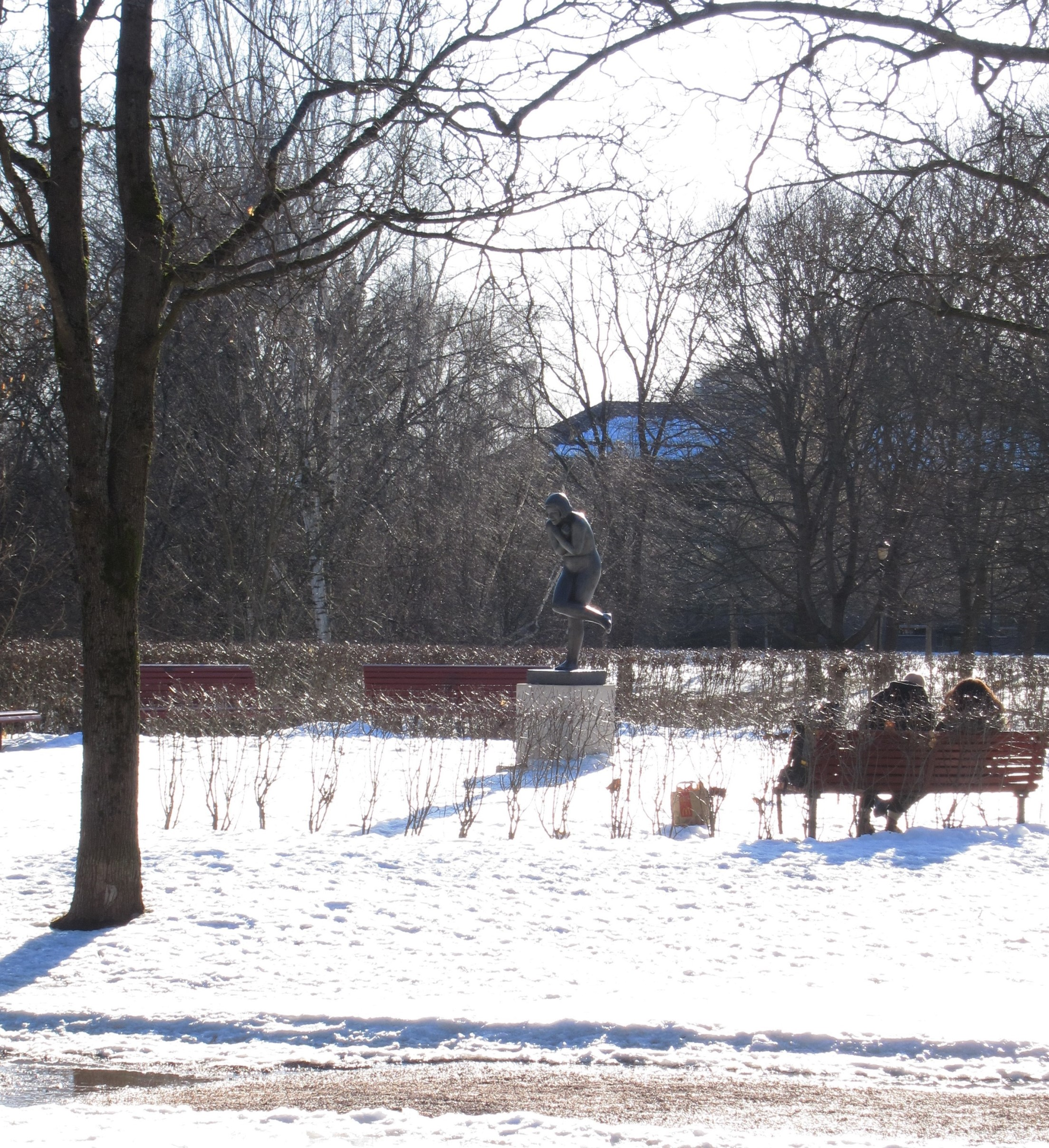
Sculpture in Frogner Park by Gustav Vigeland—"Surprised". Maier was one of two models for the sculpture.

Ruth was also one of the models for the statue "Surprised", by Gustav Vigeland. It is on permanent display in Frogner Park in Oslo. Vigeland began work on the sculpture about 1904. The model for the face of the sculpture was Inga Syvertsen; the sculpture was completed in 1942. Maier was surprised by another person entering the room while she was modelling for Vigeland, and she tried to cover her naked body, hence the posture. The statue was eventually cast in bronze in 2002. Additionally Ruth was a model for Norwegian painter Åsmund Esval.

== Arrest, deportation to Auschwitz and death ==
I believe that it is good that it has come to this. Why should we not suffer, when there is so much suffering? Do not worry about me. Perhaps I would not want to trade with you. [Ich glaube dass es gut so ist wie es gekommen ist. Warum sollen wir nicht leiden wenn so viel Leid ist? Sorg dich nicht um mich. Ich möchte vielleicht nicht mit dir tauschen].

— — Ruth Maier, last note to Gunvor Hofmo

She rented a room in Dalbergstien 3 in Oslo in the early fall of 1942 and was arrested on 26 November 1942 and deported on the SS Donau the same day. Arriving in Auschwitz on 1 December 1942, she was sent directly to the gas chambers and murdered. She was 22.

== Publishing of diary ==
Her partner Gunvor Hofmo kept Ruth's diaries and much of her correspondence. She approached Gyldendal to get them published in 1953, but was turned down. After she died in 1995, Jan Erik Vold went through her papers and came upon Ruth Maier's works. After editing them for ten years, they were published in 2007. Vold was highly impressed by the literary value of the diaries, comparing Ruth Maier's literary talent to that of Hannah Arendt and Susan Sontag. The book was translated into English by Jamie Bulloch in 2009.

Most of Ruth's diary is preserved from 1933 to 1942. She wrote in her diary about the deteriorating conditions for Austria's Jewish population following the Anschluss in 1938, her reaction to the many changes in her life, and her yearning for her family.

== 2012 apology by Norway's government ==
In a speech issued on 27 January 2012 on the occasion of International Holocaust Remembrance Day Prime Minister of Norway Jens Stoltenberg issued an official apology for the role played by Norwegians in the deportations. As reported on the official website of the Norwegian Government, Stoltenberg delivered his speech at the dock in the capital Oslo where 532 Jews boarded the cargo ship Donau on 26 November 1942, bound for Nazi camps. Stoltenberg said:

The Holocaust came to Norway on Thursday 26 November 1942. Ruth Maier was one of the many who were arrested that day. On 26 November, just as the sky was beginning to lighten, the sound of heavy boots could be heard on the stairs of the boarding house "Englehjemmet" in Oslo. A few minutes later, the slight Jewish girl was seen by her friends being led out the door of Dalsbergstien 3. Ruth Maier was last seen being forced into a black truck by two big Norwegian policemen. Five days later the 22-year-old was dead. Murdered in the gas chamber at Auschwitz. Fortunately it is part of being human that we learn from our mistakes. And it is never too late. More than 50 years after the war ended, the Storting decided to make a settlement, collectively and individually, for the economic liquidation of Jewish assets. By so doing the state accepted moral responsibility for the crimes committed against Norwegian Jews during the Second World War. What about the crimes against Ruth Maier and the other Jews? The murders were unquestionably carried out by the Nazis. But it was Norwegians who carried out the arrests. It was Norwegians who drove the trucks. And it happened in Norway.

— Jens Stoltenberg, prime minister, 27 January 2012

== Legacy ==
In 2015 Klassekampen printed a facsimile of her piece Kirkegård/Vår Frelser ("Graveyard/Our Saviour") in an article about the exhibition (until 23 August) at Bomuldsfabrikken Kunsthall in Arendal: "Krigsbilder. Kunst under okkupasjonen 1940—45", adding that "Sensitive impressions of nature and cityscapes in aquarell, testify to an independent talent."

In 2020, Ruth Maiers plass (Ruth Maier Square) was scheduled to open in Oslo; it is located at the corner of Glückstads gate/ Dovregata/ Krumgata.

Lillestrøm has a street named after her.

== See also ==
- Molly Applebaum
- Hélène Berr
- Dawid Sierakowiak

== Literature ==
- Paul Pinchas Maurer; Wien-Norwegen-Auschwitz : Das Leben von Ruth Maier, Jerusalem 2025, ISBN 978-965-92856-2-4
- Hilde Hagegrup; Du eneste: Historien om Gunvor Hofmo og Ruth Maier, Oslo 2025, ISBN 9788205626516
