= Willy Cohn =

German historian and teacher (1888-1941)

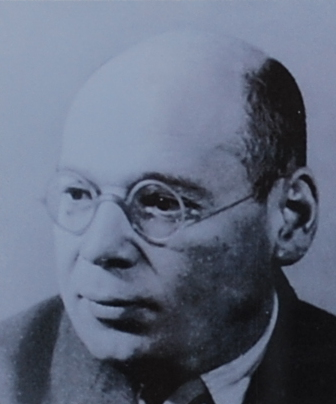
- Born: December 12, 1888; Breslau
- Died: November 29, 1941 (aged 52); Kaunas, Lithuania
- Cause of death: Executed by Nazis

Dr. Willy Cohn (12 December 1888 in Breslau – 29 November 1941 in Kaunas, Lithuania) was a German historian and teacher. During the Nazi era, he documented the Jewish life in Breslau in his diaries, until he and his family were deported to German-occupied Lithuania and killed.

Cohn's diaries, translated into English and condensed, were published in 2012 as No Justice in Germany: The Breslau Diaries, 1933-1941 by Stanford University Press. Along with Victor Klemperer, Cohn was one of the most important chroniclers of the crimes of the Nazi regime against the Jewish people.

== Biography ==
Willy Cohn came from a wealthy Jewish merchant family in Breslau. Starting in 1906, he studied history in Breslau and Heidelberg. He completed his degree in 1909 with a dissertation about the Norman-Sicilian fleet, which was published in Breslau in 1910. Cohn took the examination to qualify as a gymnasium teacher, although he aspired to pursue an academic career at the University of Breslau. He was unable to realize his plans because of discrimination against Jewish academics. Cohn became a teacher at Breslau's gymnasium in 1919. One of those students was the historian Walter Laqueur, who in 1996 called attention to Cohn's diaries.

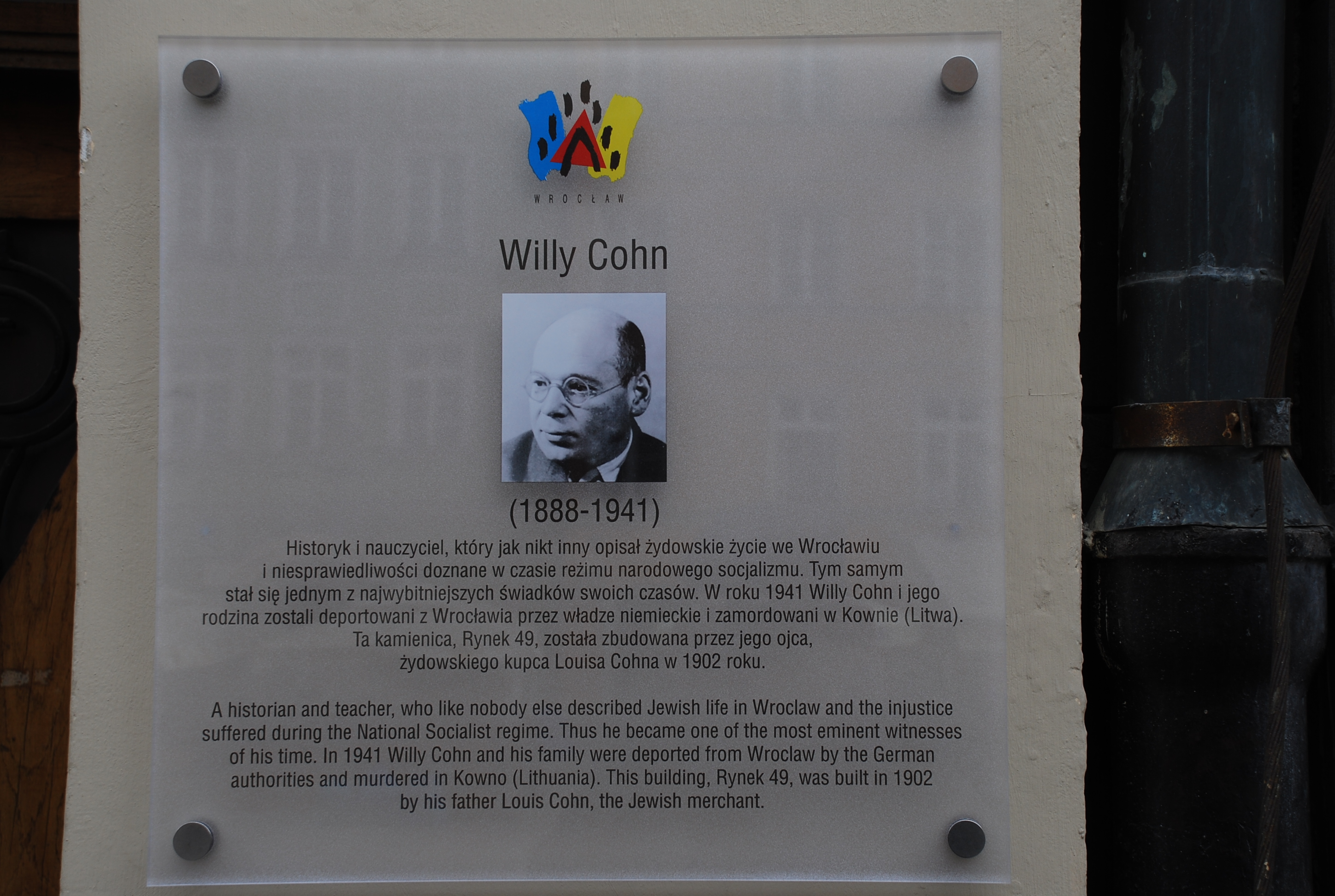
A Plaque on Wrocław's Market Square Commemorating Cohn

Despite increasing repression after the Nazis came to power, Cohn still felt connected to Germany and remained in Breslau with his second wife, Gertrud Rothman Cohn (1901-1941), and two young daughters, Susanne (1933-1941) and Tamara (1938-1941). In his diaries, he documented life under Nazi rule and the subsequent destruction of Breslau's Jewish community, then the third largest in Germany. As the persecution of Jews in Germany grew worse, the Cohns considered emigration. Cohn and his wife visited Palestine in 1937, but it offered no employment prospects to Cohn, who was not healthy enough to perform physical labor. When they wanted to flee after the Kristallnacht in 1938, it was too late; after the outbreak of the Second World War, the Nazi regime no longer allowed emigration. The Cohns endured the Nazi reign of terror in Breslau; they were arrested on November 21, 1941, and deported to German-occupied Lithuania. A few days later, on November 29, 1941, Cohn and his family were shot in the Ninth Fort, together with 2,000 other Jews from Breslau and Vienna. In 2010, a plaque commemorating Cohn was unveiled on Wrocław's Market Square. He was survived by the sons of his first marriage with Ella Proskauer Cohn Brienitizer (1891-1943): Louis and Ernst Abraham Cohn.

== No Justice in Germany: The Breslau Diaries, 1933-1941 ==
Cohn's diaries are preserved in the Central Archives for the History of the Jewish People in Jerusalem and were first published in December 2006. Cohn is considered along with Victor Klemperer as one of the most important chroniclers of the crimes of the Nazis against the Jewish people.

Cohn left a record of everyday Jewish life in Germany after 1933, under conditions of gradually increasing economic, social and cultural oppression. Acknowledging the threat from the Nazi regime in his diaries, he wrote in August 1935: "From now on, I plan to record our Jewish fate more intently; perhaps it will be of interest to later generations". His condensed diaries were published in English in 2012 by Stanford University Press as No Justice in Germany: The Breslau Diaries, 1933-1941. The review at H-Net noted:

It is rare that such perceptive and comprehensive accounts of this time period survive, and Conrads and Kronenberg [the editor and the translator] help fulfill Cohn's desire to inform future generations about his experiences. Similar to Victor Klemperer's diary, Cohn's detailed account describes what it was like to be a Jew living in the Third Reich. (...) The condensed diaries and helpful background information should certainly encourage a wider readership and general audience.

== Selected works ==
=== In English ===
- No Justice in Germany: The Breslau Diaries, 1933-1941. Willy Cohn. Edited by Norbert Conrads, translated by Kenneth Kronenberg. 2012: Stanford University Press. ISBN 978-0804773249.

=== In German ===
- „Kein Recht, nirgends.“ Tagebuch vom Untergang des Breslauer Judentums 1933–1941 (= Neue Forschungen zur schlesischen Geschichte. Bd. 13, 1–2). Herausgegeben von Norbert Conrads. 2 Bände. Böhlau, Köln u. a. 2006, ISBN 3-412-32905-3.
  - Auszug: „Kein Recht – nirgends“. Breslauer Tagebücher 1933–1941. Eine Auswahl (= Bundeszentrale für Politische Bildung. Schriftenreihe. Bd. 768). Herausgegeben von Norbert Conrads. Bundeszentrale für politische Bildung, Bonn 2009, ISBN 978-3-89331-945-9.
  - Auszug: „Kein Recht – nirgends“. Breslauer Tagebücher 1933–1941. Eine Auswahl. Herausgegeben von Norbert Conrads. Böhlau, Köln u. a. 2008, ISBN 978-3-412-20139-5.
  - Als Jude in Breslau, 1941. (Aus den Tagebüchern von Willy Israel Cohn). Herausgegeben von Joseph Walk. Attali Print-Office, Jerusalem 1975 (2. Auflage. Bleicher, Gerlingen 1984, ISBN 3-88350-011-9).
- Verwehte Spuren. Erinnerungen an das Breslauer Judentum vor seinem Untergang (= Neue Forschungen zur schlesischen Geschichte. Bd. 3). Böhlau, Köln u. a. 1995, ISBN 3-412-10394-2.
- Die Geschichte der sizilischen Flotte. 1060–1266. Vereinigter Neudruck dreier Abhandlungen aus den Jahren 1910–1926 mit Anhang: Die Basler Konzilsflotte des Jahres 1437. Die Bedeutung der Seemacht in der Geschichte. Scientia, Aalen 1978, ISBN 3-511-00859-X.
- Juden und Staufer in Unteritalien und Sizilien. Aufsätze zur Geschichte der Juden im Mittelalter, über ihr Verhältnis zu den Stauferkaisern und den Königen von Sizilien, sowie zur allgemeinen Staufergeschichte. Eine Sammlung verstreut erschienener Schriften aus den Jahren 1919–1936. Scientia, Aalen 1978, ISBN 3-511-09060-1.
- Hermann von Salza (= Abhandlungen der Schlesischen Gesellschaft für Vaterländische Cultur. Geisteswissenschaftliche Reihe, Bd. 4, ZDB-ID 501806-7). M. & H. Marcus, Breslau 1930 (Neudruck. Mit Anhang: Hat Hermann von Salza das Deutschordensland betreten? Scientia-Verlag, Aalen 1978, ISBN 3-511-00860-3).
- Kaiser Friedrich II. (= Teubners Quellensammlung für den Geschichtsunterricht. 4. Reihe, Bd. 14, ZDB-ID 1107813-3). B. G. Teubner, Leipzig u. a. 1930.
- Wilhelm Liebknecht. Ein Lebensbild. Der Jugend erzählt. Volkswacht-Buchhandlung, Breslau 1930.
- Die Geschichte der Juden in Schlesien. In Erwin Hintze: Das Judentum in der Geschichte Schlesiens. Katalog der vom Verein „Jüdisches Museum Breslau“ in den Räumen des Schlesischen Museums für Kunstgewerbe und Altertümer veranstalteten Ausstellung. Breslau 1929.
- Ein Lebensbild von August Bebel. Der Jugend erzählt. Volkswacht-Buchhandlung, Breslau 1927.
- Capistrano, ein Breslauer Judenfeind in der Mönchskutte. In: Menorah. Jüdisches Familienblatt für Wissenschaft, Kunst und Literatur. Jg. 4, Nr. 5, Mai 1926, ZDB-ID 529344-3, S. 262–265, Online auf der Digitalbibliothek der 110 wichtigsten deutschsprachigen jüdischen Zeitschriften Compactmemory, das von der DFG finanziert wurde und sich auf den Seiten der Goetheuniversität Frankfurt befindet. Online hier . (Mai 1926 auswählen und das PDF des Authors Cohn abrufen S. 262 folgende). Abhandlung über die Durchführung eines progromhaften Prozesses durch den Wanderprediger und Judenverfolger Johannes Capistranus gegen die Juden von Breslau im Jahre 1543, bei dem 42 Menschen zu Tode kamen und alle ca. 300 Juden aus Breslau vertrieben wurde. Grund für die Anklage war ein erfundenes Verbrechen, ein Hostienfrevel. 1690 wurde Capistranus heiliggesprochen und ist es noch heute (2014).
- Die Geschichte der sizilischen Flotte unter der Regierung Friedrichs II. (1197–1250). Priebatsch, Breslau 1926 (Neudruck in: Die Geschichte der sizilischen Flotte. 1060–1266. 1978).
- Das Zeitalter der Hohenstaufen in Sizilien. Ein Beitrag zur Entstehung des modernen Beamtenstaates (= Untersuchungen zur deutschen Staats- und Rechts-Geschichte. Heft 134, ISSN 0083-4572). Marcus, Breslau 1925 (2. Neudruck. Scientia-Verlag, Aalen 1995, ISBN 3-511-04134-1).
- Ein Lebensbild von Friedrich Engels. Der Jugend erzählt. Volkswacht-Buchhandlung, Breslau 1925
- Ein Lebensbild von Karl Marx. Der Jugend erzählt. Volkswacht-Buchhandlung, Breslau 1923.
- Ein Lebensbild Ferdinand Lassalles. Der Jugend erzählt. J. H. W. Dietz Nachf., Stuttgart 1921.
- Das Zeitalter der Normannen in Sizilien (= Bücherei der Kultur und Geschichte. Bd. 6, ZDB-ID 541504-4). Schröder, Bonn u. a. 1920.
- Die Geschichte der sizilischen Flotte unter der Regierung Konrads IV. und Manfreds. (1250–1266) (= Abhandlungen zur Verkehrs- und Seegeschichte. Bd. 9, ZDB-ID 501643-5). Curtius, Berlin 1920 (Neudruck. Scientia-Verlag, Aalen 1978, ISBN 3-511-03739-5).
- Die Geschichte der normannisch-sicilischen Flotte unter der Regierung Rogers I. und Rogers II. (1060-1154) (= Historische Untersuchungen. Heft 1, ZDB-ID 500550-4). Marcus, Breslau 1910 (Neudruck in: Die Geschichte der sizilischen Flotte. 1060–1266. 1978).

== See also ==
- List of Holocaust diarists
- List of diarists
- List of posthumous publications of Holocaust victims
