= Åsmund Esval =

Norwegian artist

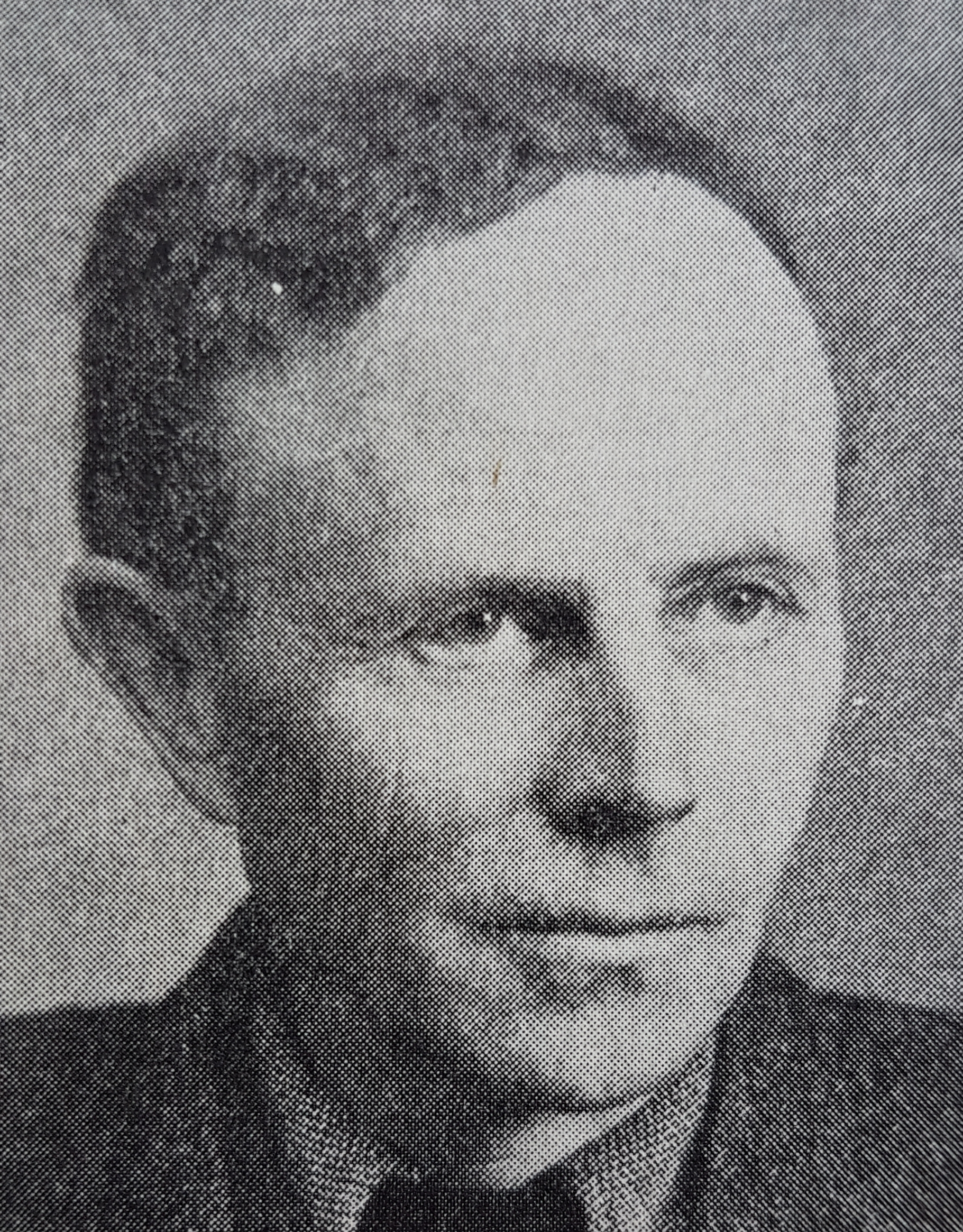

Åsmund (Aasmund) Esval (16 February 1889 – 17 October 1971 in Oslo) was a Norwegian painter.

== Biography ==
Aasmund Esval was born at Nes in Romerike, Norway. From 1909 to 1919, Esval was educated at the Norwegian National Academy of Craft and Art Industry. Esval trained at the Académie de l'Art Moderne in Paris under Othon Friesz and Raoul Dufy from 1919 to 1921. Esval studied at the Académie Scandinave Maison Watteau in Paris under Per Krogh from 1926 to 1927, and at the Norwegian National Academy of Fine Arts under Georg Jacobsen 1935–1937. In the 1950s and 1960s, Esval taught at Friundervisningen in Oslo. Also during his career, Esval also taught drawing at the Norwegian National Academy of Craft and Art Industry.

Esval was primarily a landscape painter that performed a series of quiet Norwegian landscapes constructed by geometric principles. Esval lived in several local farms in Gudbrandsdal, Norway during the 1950s and 1960s. The painting Ringebu Kirke is an example of the many landscape scenes he obtained from the Norwegian valleys. In 1928, Esval made the stained glass windows of Tangen Church (Tangen kirke) in Drammen, Norway.

Additionally Esval did portrait painting including subjects such as Ruth Maier who was a model for Esval during her time in Norway. Maier was an Austrian woman whose diaries describing her experiences of the Holocaust in Austria and Norway were published in 2007 by Norwegian poet Jan Erik Vold. Maier was deported to Auschwitz in November 1942, where she was killed on arrival, aged only twenty-two.

Beginning in 1928, Esval was a regular participant in the Autumn Exhibition (Høstutstillingen) in Oslo. Esval is represented in the Norwegian National Gallery of Art, Norwegian National Touring Exhibitions and Norwegian Royal Gallery.

== Bibliography ==
- Bull-Hansen, Rolf; Esval, Åsmund (1924). Applied Drawing in School. Cappelen.
- Esval, Åsmund (1941). Ǻsmund Esval: Paintings, Drawing Exhibitions: 4 October-2 November 1941. Kunstnernes Hus.
