= Arnold Daghani =

Arnold Daghani (22 February 1909 in Suceava, Austria-Hungary – 6 April 1985 in Hove, United Kingdom) was a Romanian-born Jewish artist and writer and Holocaust survivor. In 1941 he and his wife Anisoara were arrested and sent to the Nazi labor camp of Mykhailivka (Mikhailowka) in Ukraine in 1941. Camp inmates worked on constructing Durchgangsstrasse IV, a major military road. While there Daghani chronicled his experiences in a diary and artwork which he managed to smuggle with himself when he escaped to Budapest in 1943. In 1947 he published these, first in Romanian, Groapa este în livada de visini, later translated into English under the title The Grave is in the Cherry Orchard appearing in ADAM International Review. After the war, he lived in Israel, France, Switzerland, and England.

Many of Arnold Daghani's works are held in The Arnold Daghani Collection at the University of Sussex, UK.

== See also ==
- List of Holocaust diarists
- List of diarists
- List of posthumous publications of Holocaust victims

== Bibliography ==
- Bohm-Duchen, Monica. Daghani. London: Diptych, 1987. ISBN 1870627008.
- Daghani, Arnold. Arnold Daghani's Memories of Mikhailowka: The Illustrated Diary of a Slave Labour Camp Survivor. London: Vallentine Mitchell, 2009. ISBN 085303639X.
- Daghani, Arnold (1961). The Grave is in the Cherry Orchard. ADAM International Review. No. 291-293.
- Schultz, Deborah. Pictorial Narrative in the Nazi Period: Felix Nussbaum, Charlotte Salomon and Arnold Daghani. London: Routledge, 2009. ISBN 0415490952.
- University of Sussex: Centre for German-Jewish Studies. "The Arnold Daghani Collection". http://www.sussex.ac.uk. 2006. Retrieved 2012-3-13.
- Arno, Anna (9 June 2026). Paul Celan, A Life. Harvard University Press. ISBN 9780674305304.
