= Chaim Aron Kaplan =

Polish-Jewish educator, Hebraist, and Warsaw Ghetto diarist

Chaim Aron Kaplan (Hebrew: חיים אהרן קפלן 19 September 1880 – December 1942 or January 1943) was a Polish-Jewish educator, Hebraist, diarist, and victim of the Holocaust. He is best known for his detailed diary chronicling daily life and mass persecution inside the Warsaw Ghetto, considered one of the most significant primary sources on the destruction of Warsaw Jewry during the Holocaust.

== Early life and education ==
Kaplan was born on 19 September 1880 in Horodyszcze (then part of the Russian Empire, now in Belarus). He received a traditional yeshiva education and later studied at the Mir Yeshiva. He subsequently attended the Government Pedagogical Institute in Vilna (now Vilnius).

In 1902 he moved to Warsaw, where he founded a private Hebrew-language elementary school, which he directed for approximately four decades.

== Career ==
Kaplan was a prominent Hebraist and an early advocate of teaching Hebrew as a spoken language using the “direct method.” He wrote textbooks on Hebrew grammar, Jewish history for children, and Jewish customs. He also contributed articles to Hebrew and Yiddish journals.

In 1937 he published Pezurai, a collection of essays on the Hebrew language and Jewish education.

== The Warsaw Ghetto diary ==
Kaplan began keeping a diary in 1933, but after the German invasion of Poland in 1939 it became a detailed day-by-day record of Jewish life under Nazi oppression. Written in Hebrew, the diary spans from 1933 to his final entry on 4 August 1942.

He documented deportations, starvation, forced labor, and the collapse of daily life in the Warsaw Ghetto, expressing a conscious awareness of writing for future generations. During the mass deportations of 1942 (the Großaktion), Kaplan continued to record events under extreme conditions.

Before his deportation, he entrusted his notebooks to a Jewish forced labourer, who smuggled them to a Polish acquaintance, ensuring their preservation. The diary survived the war and is considered one of the most comprehensive personal testimonies from the Warsaw Ghetto.

== Death ==
Kaplan and his wife Tzipora (or Tauba) were most likely deported to the Treblinka extermination camp in December 1942 or January 1943, where they were murdered.

== Legacy ==
Kaplan's diary was published posthumously in English as Scroll of Agony: The Warsaw Diary of Chaim A. Kaplan (1965), edited by Abraham I. Katsh. It has since been translated into multiple languages and remains a crucial source for historians of the Holocaust.

== Selected works ==
- Hebräische Grammatik (1924)
- Pezurai (1937)
- Scroll of Agony: The Warsaw Diary of Chaim A. Kaplan (1965)

== See also ==
- List of Holocaust diarists
