= Dawid Sierakowiak =

Jewish diarist who died in the Holocaust

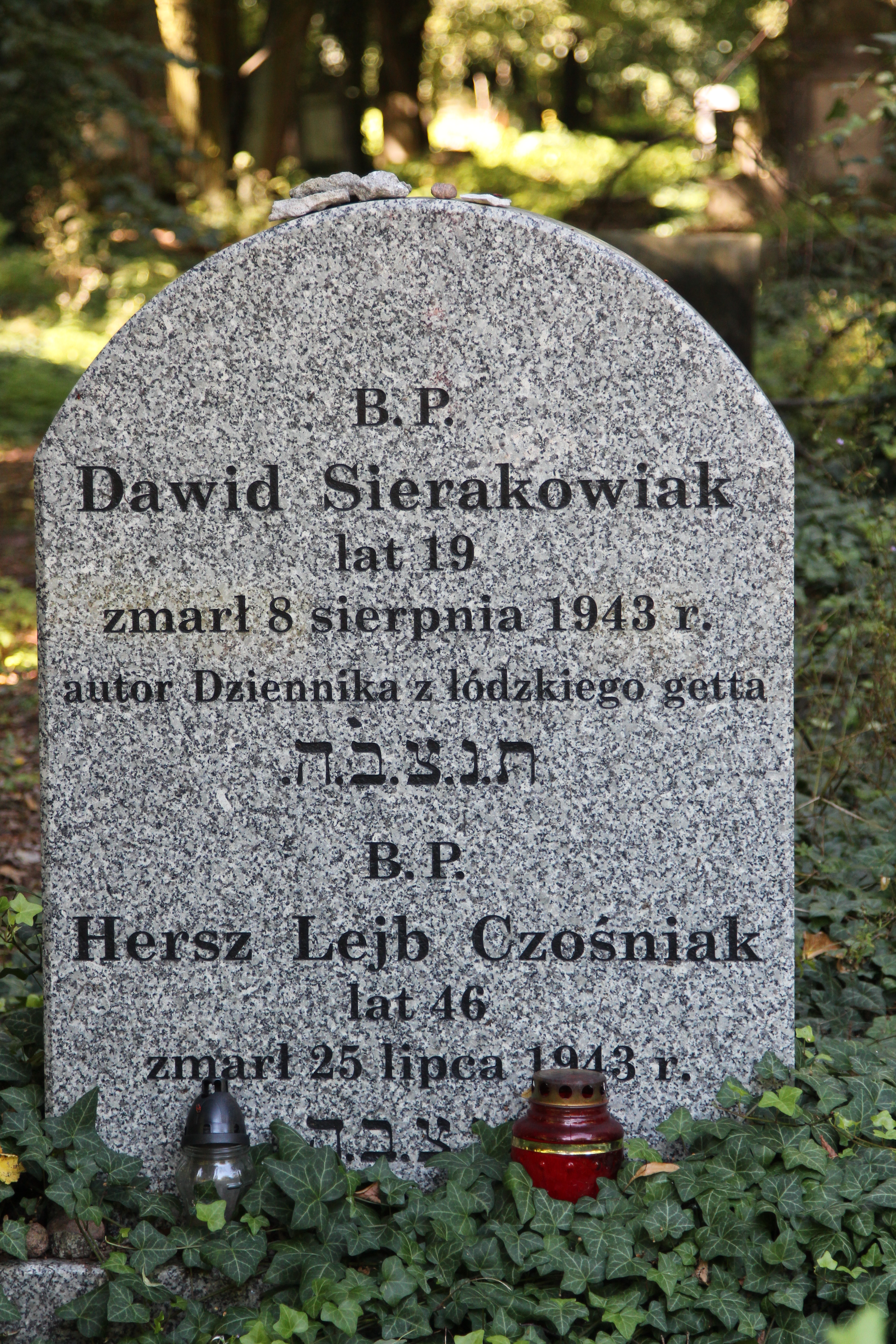
- Born: July 25, 1924; Łódź, Poland
- Died: August 8, 1943 (aged 19); Łódź Ghetto, Poland
- Burial place: Jewish Cemetery, Łódź
- Known for: Holocaust diary

Dawid Sierakowiak (July 25, 1924 – August 8, 1943) was a Polish Jewish teenager who died in the Holocaust, along with his entire family. He is notable for the diary he kept while in the Łódź Ghetto in the last two years of his life. He died of tuberculosis, starvation and exhaustion in the ghetto at the age of nineteen.

The diary was found after the war, handwritten in five composition notebooks, and was first published in Polish in 1960. The English language version, The Diary of Dawid Sierakowiak: Five Notebooks from the Lodz Ghetto, appeared in 1996; it was translated from the original Polish by Kamil Turkowski and edited and introduced by Alan Adelson. Sierakowiak's diary is considered an important source of information on daily life in the Łódź Ghetto.

== Early life ==
Sierakowiak was born in Łódź, Poland on July 25, 1924, to a cabinetmaker, Majłech Sierakowiak, and his wife Sura. He had a younger sister, Natalia (called Nadzia by the family), who was born on August 12, 1927. The family was of modest means and lived in the Bałuty district. Before World War II began, Sierakowiak attended a private Jewish gymnasium on scholarship and was at the head of his class. He enjoyed reading and learning foreign languages, and read and wrote in Yiddish, English, French, German, Hebrew and Latin.

On June 28, 1939, just before his fifteenth birthday, he began keeping a diary. At the time, he was attending a Jewish youth camp in the Tatra Mountains. He returned home to Łódź on July 26 and continued to write regular dated entries in his diary through the German invasion of Poland in September, until December 31 of that year. The next diary notebook in the chronology is believed to have been lost. His next available diary notebook begins over a year later on April 6, 1941, by which time the Nazis had forced Sierakowiak and his family into the Łódź Ghetto.

== Łódź Ghetto ==
Regular topics in Sierakowiak's diary included the war effort, his reading, his involvement in a secret Communist youth organization, his state of health, his family, and the rations being distributed. He regularly noted exactly what was received in the official rations, in what amounts and how much was charged for it, and also the shortages of common staples and the poor quality of the food. The shortages forced the family to try new foods formerly considered unfit for human consumption, including rotten vegetables.

Polish literary scholar Jacek Leociak described the diary as a “slow transformation from a diary of a young intellectual into a diary of a starving man dying.” By May 1941, three students in Sierakowiak's class at the ghetto gymnasium had died of hunger. Sierakowiak himself noted in August that year, "I got the best grades in the class: all As and Bs. But what good are they when I'm still hungry and keep feeling so terribly exhausted?" He composed poetry and read, including books by Dostoevsky, Ibsen, Schopenhauer and Strindberg, in his free time. After he was elected president of his school's student council, he spoke out against the widespread malnutrition among the student body and urged the council to demand better nourishment from the Judenrat.

The starvation situation strained Sierakowiak's home life severely. He perceived his father Majłech as a threat to his mother Sura and sister Nadzia's survival, writing that Majłech manipulated his wife and daughter into giving him parts of their own shares of the family's insufficient rations. He felt contempt for his father not only for his greed and theft of food, but also for his uncleanliness and refusal to work. Sierakowiak was not able to complete his education, as the ghetto schools eventually closed. In October 1941, at the age of seventeen, he began his first slave labor assignment at a saddlery workshop as an apprentice. He held various jobs during his time in the ghetto, and also did private tutoring in different subjects. As his family did not have a table in their ghetto apartment, he had to use the windowsill as a tutoring space. In December 1942, he noted that it was too cold and too dimly lit to read books at home.

Sierakowiak's mother was deported to her death at the Chełmno extermination camp in September 1942, after she proved too weak to pass a medical examination. Sierakowiak was devastated and noted Sura had always shared her food with others, which placed her own health at risk. In January 1943, Majłech had a bad fall, broke his ankle and took to his bed. On March 6, he died at home of “weakening of the heart muscle”. When Sierakowiak noted his father’s passing in his diary, he said a doctor had prescribed injections for his father on the day of his death, but the medication had been unavailable in the ghetto for six months.

In the aftermath of his father's death, Sierakowiak's own health worsened. The last of his surviving diary notebooks breaks off after April 15, 1943. That month he wrote that he had gotten a job in the ghetto bakery, where he would be able to eat as much bread as he wanted. In his final entry he wrote, "Again, out of impatience I feel myself beginning to fall into melancholy. There really is no way out of this for us." On August 8, 1943, two weeks after his nineteenth birthday and almost four months after his last known diary entry, Sierakowiak died of tuberculosis, starvation and exhaustion. He is buried at the Jewish Cemetery on Bracka Street.

His younger sister Nadzia, the last surviving member of the family, was sixteen years old at the time of Sierakowiak‘s death. Nadzia was sent to Auschwitz when the ghetto was liquidated a year later in 1944, and is presumed to have met her death there, although nothing specific is known about her fate.

== Discovery of diary and publication ==
After the end of World War II, a non-Jewish inhabitant of Łódź returned to his apartment and found five of Sierakowiak's diary notebooks piled on the stove. He reported his find to the Regional Commission for the Examination of Nazi Crimes. There are believed to be at least two notebooks missing from the chronology. The missing notebooks may have been burned for fuel during the winter of 1944–45.

The first two notebooks from Sierakowiak's diary were published in 1960 in a volume edited by Łódź Ghetto survivor and historian Lucjan Dobroszycki. The journalist Konrad Turowski purchased the three remaining notebooks in 1967. The English translation was first published in 1996. It has also been published in Brazil, France, Italy and Sweden. Publishers Weekly called it “a repetitive and detailed account of a population being methodically ground into dust.” Jacek Leociak, in the European Journal of Life Writing, described the diary as “a relentless observation of one's own dying, a cruel vivisection carried out to the very end,” and “grim testimony to the victory of hunger over body and mind”.

Two of Sierakowiak's diary notebooks are in the Jewish Historical Institute in Warsaw, Poland and the other three are in the United States Holocaust Memorial Museum.

== See also ==
- Molly Applebaum
- Mary Berg
- Anne Frank
- Chaim Aron Kaplan
- Lena Mukhina
- Rywka Lipsczyc
- Ruth Maier
- Yitskhok Rudashevski
- Chaim Rumkowski
- Renia Spiegel
