= Yitskhok Rudashevski =

Jewish diarist from the Vilna Ghetto who died in the Holocaust

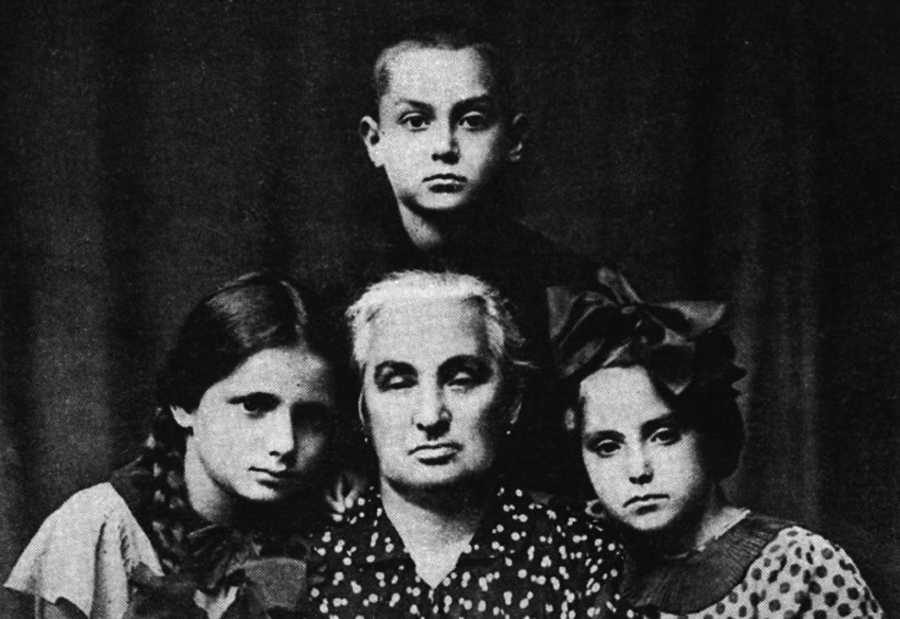
Yitzkhok Rudashevski (top) with his grandmother and cousins

Yitskhok Rudashevski (also Isaac Rudashevsky) (10 December 1927, Vilnius – 1 October 1943) was a young Jewish teenager who lived in the Vilna Ghetto, Lithuania. He wrote a diary from June 1941 to April 1943 which detailed his life and struggles living in the ghetto. He was shot to death in the Ponary massacre during the liquidation of September–October 1943. His diary was discovered by his cousin Sorah/Sarah née Voloshina Kliwiec/Klivetz/Klibatz, Hebrew: קליבץ), in 1944. She escaped the ghetto, fought with the Jewish partisans, and when Vilnius was liberated, she returned to the hideout.

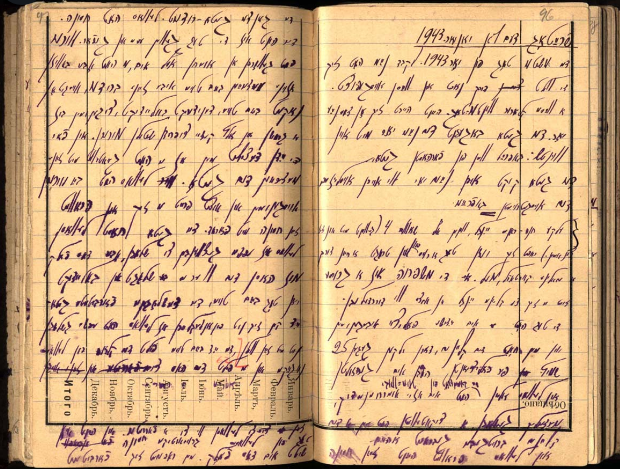
Pages from the diary

Fragments of the diary were published in its original Yiddish in 1953 in Di goldene keyt magazine. Abraham Yavin translated it into Hebrew in 1968. An English translation, The Diary of the Vilna Ghetto (from the Yiddish original and Hebrew publication) by Percy Matenko was published in 1973 by Ghetto Fighters' House, Israel. A Hebrew translation of the diary was published by the Ghetto Fighters' House that same year. The original diary is held in the archives of the YIVO Institute for Jewish Research in New York. In 2018 it was published in Yiddish and Lithuanian. In 2024 a new English translation of the diary by Solon Beinfeld, edited by Samuel D. Kassow, was published under the title The Rudashevski Diary.

The stolperstein commemorating Rudashevski is laid at Rūdninkų g. 8 in Vilnius where he attended the CBS Jewish gymnasium.

== See also ==
- Kazimierz Sakowicz - a Polish journalist who observed the Ponary massacre and wrote a diary about the events
- Dawid Rubinowicz
- Rywka Lipszyc
- Dawid Sierakowiak — a Polish-Jewish teenager who kept a diary in the Łódź Ghetto
