= Etty Hillesum and the Flow of Presence =

2008 book by Dutch philosopher Meins G. S. Coetsier

Etty Hillesum and the Flow of Presence: A Voegelinian Analysis
- Author: Meins G. S. Coetsier
- Language: English
- Series: Eric Voegelin Institute Series in Political Philosophy: Studies in Religion and Politics
- Subject: Etty Hillesum, Eric Voegelin, religion, philosophy, mysticism, spirituality, World War II, memoirs, diary
- Publisher: University of Missouri Press
- Publication date: 2008
- Publication place: United States
- Media type: Hardcover, Paperback
- ISBN: 978-0-8262-1797-4
- OCLC: 183147395
- Dewey Decimal: 940.53/18092 B 22
- LC Class: DS135.N6 H5447 2008

Etty Hillesum and the Flow of Presence: A Voegelinian Analysis is a 2008 book by Dutch philosopher Meins G. S. Coetsier.

Coetsier makes us of Voegelin's rearticulation of the experience of the In-Between (Plato: metaxy (Note: Metaxy (μεταξύ): 1. as defined from Plato's Symposium, via the character Priestess Diotima, is the "in-between."; 2. Metaxy is defined as the "in-between" or "middle ground"; 3. Diotima as tutor to Socrates uses the term to show how oral tradition can be perceived by different people in different ways.; 4. In her depiction in the poem by Socrates showing that Eros was not an extreme or purity. That Eros as a daimon was in-between the divine Gods and mankind.; 5. Thus showing the flaws of the oral tradition in its use of contrast to express the truth showing oral tradition's weakness to sophistry. Pointing to the idea that reality is perceptive though ones character which includes ones desires and prejudges and ones limited understanding of logic. That man moves through the world of becoming or the ever changing world of sensory perception into the world of being which is the world of forms, absolutes and transcendence.; 6. Man transcends his place in the becoming by eros, were man reaches the Highest Good, an intuitive and mystical state of consciousness.; 7. The metaxy symbolises the experience of the noetic quest as a transition of the psyche from mortality to immortality. Diotima expressed that Eros was in-between the Gods and mankind. Neoplatonists like Plotinus later used the term metaxy to express an ontological placement of Man between the Gods and animals.; For Voegelin: Man experiences himself as tending beyond his human imperfection toward the perfection of the divine ground that moves him. The spiritual man, the daimonios aner, as he is moved in his quest of the ground, moves somewhere between knowledge and ignorance (metaxy sophias kai amathias). “The whole realm of the spiritual (daimonion) is halfway indeed between (metaxy) god and man” (Symposium 202a). Thus, the In-Between – the metaxy – is not an empty space between the poles of the tension but the "realm of the spiritual"; it is the reality of "man's converse with the gods" (202-203), the mutual participation (methexis, metalepsis) of human in divine, and divine in human, reality.)), the central locus for the recapture of reality historically lost to consciousness.

== Synopsis ==
Etty Hillesum and the Flow of Presence: A Voegelinian Analysis is an account of the life, works and vision of two prominent mystical thinkers, Etty Hillesum and Eric Voegelin, whose lives were shaped by the totalitarian Nazi regime. This book explores how mystical attunement to the flow of presence is the key to the development of Hillesum's life and writings. Voegelin's analysis of the history of order is focused on the responses of individuals and societies to the divine presence. Hillesum's The Letters and Diaries illustrates her heroic struggle to come to terms with her personal life in the context of her gradual response to the flowing presence.

Hillesum died at the age of twenty-nine in Auschwitz midway through World War II. All her energy had been absorbed in a daily search for the meaning of her life, for an understanding of her relationships with others, and for an insight into the ultimate purpose of each individual's contribution to the well being and maintenance of the human spirit.

The author visited Hillesum's family home in Deventer, Amsterdam, where she studied; Camp Westerbork in the Netherlands, where she was detained; and Auschwitz in Poland, where she was imprisoned and murdered. He read Hillesum's diaries in the Dutch language, preserved at the Joods Historisch Museum of Amsterdam. He claims this helped him become aware of how Hillesum brought "mind" and "heart" together in a personal attunement to the flow of presence.

Voegelin's philosophical symbol "the flow of presence" ("the intersection of time with the timeless") is designed to "catch" changes and shifts in the mode of human responsiveness to the divine presence and it is especially helpful in clarifying what is taking place in the soul of Hillesum. Her response to the flow of presence while she was undergoing significant breakthroughs in her spiritual life in the context of a period of overwhelming social disorder, amounts to a testament of great courage. In one of his final conclusions Coetsier writes: "The complexity of the human condition will require the ability to be human in transcending our immediate and simply given context through an attunement to the flow of presence."

== Reception ==
Macon Boczek writes: "Coetsier devotes the opening chapter to Etty Hillesum’' life. He follows this with a chapter on her letters and diaries. He then devotes a further chapter to the thought of Eric Voegelin and in the final chapter, shows the remarkable coincidence of her spiritual experiences with Voegelin's own." Boczek further discussed how the book traced Hillesum's shift from secular distress toward what Coestier calls an interior openness to the divine.

The book also received a positive reception from other scholars in the field who noted the author's attention to detail and creative approaches.

== Meins G. S. Coetsier ==
The author, Dr. Meins G. S. Coetsier, is staff member, film director and webmaster of the Etty Hillesum Research Centre. He obtained his B.A. in philosophy in 2004 and was awarded Master of Arts in Philosophy, at The Milltown Institute of Theology and Philosophy in Dublin, Ireland in 2006. In 2008, he was awarded Doctor of Philosophy at Ghent University ( Department of Philosophy and moral sciences) with a study on Eric Voegelin. Coetsier is director of the Centre of Eric Voegelin Studies (EVS) at Ghent University and is founder of the Flow of Presence Academy (FPA).
