= Mary Berg =

Polish Holocaust survivor and author (1924–2013)

- Front cover of The Diary of Mary Berg: Growing up in the Warsaw Ghetto by Mary Berg
- Born: Miriam Wattenberg; October 10, 1924; Łódź, Poland
- Died: April 2013 (aged 88); York, Pennsylvania, United States
- Occupation: Diarist
- Spouse: William Pentin

Mary Berg (born Miriam Wattenberg; October 10, 1924 (Note: S.L. Shneiderman, who edited Berg's diary, states that she was born April 20, 1924, but speculates that Berg used a false birth date because it was forbidden for her to have the same birthday as Adolf Hitler (born April 20, 1889), and that she used the pseudonym "Berg" perhaps to protect any surviving relatives in Europe, since her diary was published in the United States during World War II.) – April 2013) was a survivor of the Warsaw Ghetto and author of a Holocaust diary, which contains her personal journal entries written between October 10, 1939, and March 5, 1944, during the occupation of Poland in World War II.

== Life ==
Mary Berg's father was Shaya (Sruel, Stanley) Wattenberg, a local gallery owner in prewar Łódź. Her mother Lena, was an American citizen residing in the Second Polish Republic. Lena Wattenberg's parents, Mr. and Mrs. Benno Zol, were the Zolotarewski (later Zol) family of Long Branch, New Jersey. Mary had a sister, Anna. The sisters qualified for American citizenship by virtue of their mother's nationality.

During the invasion of Poland by Nazi Germany, the family relocated to Warsaw from Łódź. Due to their American connection, prior to the liquidation of the ghetto (Grossaktion Warsaw), the sisters and their parents were detained in prison in Pawiak in July 1942. They heard the shots and screams of the Warsaw Jews being taken to the Umschlagplatz where they were loaded on trains and taken to their deaths at Treblinka. At that time, they had limited contact with friends and relatives who were trying to avoid deportation. In January 1943, Mary and her family were transferred to Vittel, a French internment camp for British and American citizens and others who temporarily escaped death.

On March 1, 1944, they boarded a train for Lisbon. After their departure, many of the inmates of Vittel, including Mary's roommate, were transferred back to German-occupied Poland to their deaths at Auschwitz. In Lisbon, the Bergs boarded the ocean liner SS Gripsholm for the voyage to America. Her memoir, Warsaw Ghetto, describes her years in the ghetto and her months in Pawiak and Vittel. She arrived in the United States in March 1944, at the age of 19. Her memoir was serialized in American newspapers in 1944, making it one of the earliest accounts of the Holocaust to be written in English.

== Publishing ==
In June 1944, the publishing house Dial Press declined to publish the manuscript saying that the market was flooded with books about concentration camps and Nazi persecution. The book was eventually published by L.B. Fischer in February 1945 but went out of print in the 1950s. It was republished in 2006 by Oneworld Publications as The diary of Mary Berg: growing up in the Warsaw ghetto (ISBN 1851685855/ISBN 978-1851685851), and again on April 1, 2009. A 75th Anniversary edition was published in 2018.

== Later years ==
It is not known for sure what happened to the few friends and two uncles that Mary left behind who were still alive when she fled. She pledged to do everything she could to "save those who could still be saved, and to avenge those who were so bitterly humiliated in their last moments. And those who were ground into ash, I will always see them alive. I will tell everything...." Mary was active in telling the story of the Warsaw ghetto through the early 1950s, being on radio and making appearances to publicize what we now call the Holocaust. After that, she dropped out of public view. She resolutely refused to participate publicly in any Holocaust-related events, zealously guarding her privacy. She would not give permission to republish her diary though it was republished anyway because her publisher and translator, S.L. Shneiderman, held the copyright. She lived in York, Pennsylvania, for many years, where she wed William Pentin and was known as Mary Pentin. She was something of a recluse; her neighbors did not know she was Jewish let alone that she had lived through the horrors of the Warsaw ghetto. Her known relatives, descended from her sister, Anna, who married a pathologist, Leon Williams Powell Jr. and had four children, have either refused to provide or have disclaimed any new or additional information about Berg, so little is known about her years in the United States.

Mary Berg Pentin died in York, Pennsylvania, in April 2013, aged 88. Her identity was discovered after her death when a part time antiques dealer bought her scrapbook at an estate sale because he was interested in her photos of aircraft. Later, at the request of one of Mary's nephews, he donated the material to the U.S. Holocaust Memorial Museum where it is now available online. Her diary was adapted into a play titled A Bouquet of Alpine Violets by Jan Krzyzanowski.

== See also ==
- List of Holocaust diarists
