= Sam Pivnik =

Holocaust survivor (1926–2017)

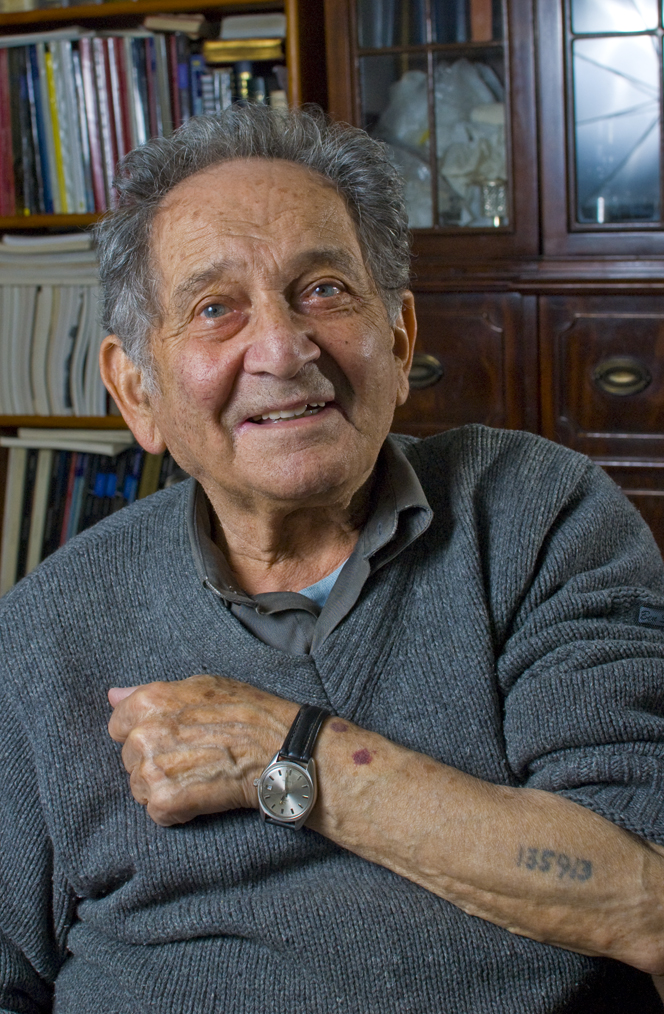

Sam Pivnik (born Szmuel Pivnik; 1 September 1926, Będzin – 30 August 2017, London) was a Holocaust survivor, author and memoirist. He was the second son of Lajb Pivnik, a tailor, and Feigel Pivnik. As a Jewish family, the Pivniks were forced to live in the Kamionka Ghetto in Będzin from early 1943, and on 6 August 1943 the family were deported to Auschwitz II-Birkenau. His parents, younger sister Chana and younger brothers Meir, Wolf and Josef, were murdered on arrival. His older sister Hendla survived for a brief period before she was sent to be gassed.

Pivnik was registered in the camp and tattooed with prisoner number 135913. After a period of approximately two weeks in the 'Quarantine' area of Birkenau, he was assigned to the Rampkommando where he worked unloading newly arrived trains after the prisoners had been taken away for entry to the camp or gassing. This gave him access to food and valuables from prisoners' luggage and he was able to use this to keep himself fed and to bribe Kapos, prisoner-overseers and trusties.

On 27 December 1943, Pivnik was admitted to the prisoner infirmary in the Quarantine area KL Auschwitz II-Birkenau, B IIa, Block 9, with suspected typhus. He says that he survived several 'selections' and on 11 January 1944 was admitted to the main prisoners' hospital at KL-Auschwitz II-Birkenau B IIf.

Following his recovery from typhus, Pivnik was selected for a work detail to go to KL Auschwitz III/Fürstengrube, a coal mine where he was assigned to the construction detail and appointed as a Vorarbeiter or overseer. He says that during his period at Auschwitz, he came to know both Otto Moll and Josef Mengele by sight.

On 19 January 1945 the camp at Fürstengrube was evacuated in the face of the advancing Red Army and prisoners who were fit enough to move were, initially, marched to a railhead at Gleiwitz. Many of those who were not fit were shot by SS guards led by SS-Oberscharführer Max Schmidt. After a nine-day rail journey in which the prisoners were given no additional rations, Pivnik's group arrived at KL Dora-Mittelbau on 28 January 1945.

He spent the next three months on construction work before he – together with approximately 200 other former Fürstengrube prisoners – were evacuated by barge along the River Elbe to Holstein in northern Germany. In Holstein, the prisoners were assigned to farm labour, with Pivnik himself sent to work at Schmidt's parents' farm at Neuglasau, Segeberg, Schleswig-Holstein.

At the beginning of May 1945, Pivnik and other former Fürstengrube prisoners, were marched to the port of Neustadt from where they were loaded, on 3 May 1945, aboard the former German cruise ship Cap Arcona which was being used as a prison ship for concentration camp inmates along with the Thielbek, Athen and Deutschland.

Within hours of Pivnik boarding, the flotilla was attacked by fighter-bombers of the Royal Air Force and both Cap Arcona and Thielbek were set on fire and sunk. As one of the last to board, Pivnik was on an upper deck and able to jump from the ship and eventually swim ashore. Out of approximately 7,000 prisoners on board the two ships, no more than 500 survived.

Pivnik was liberated by the British Army in Neustadt on 4 May 1945. Sam's memoir Survivor – Auschwitz, The Death March and My Fight for Freedom was published on 30 August 2012. He died exactly five years later in London on 30 August 2017, two days before his 91st birthday.
