= Věra Kohnová =

Czech Jewish diarist (1929–1942)

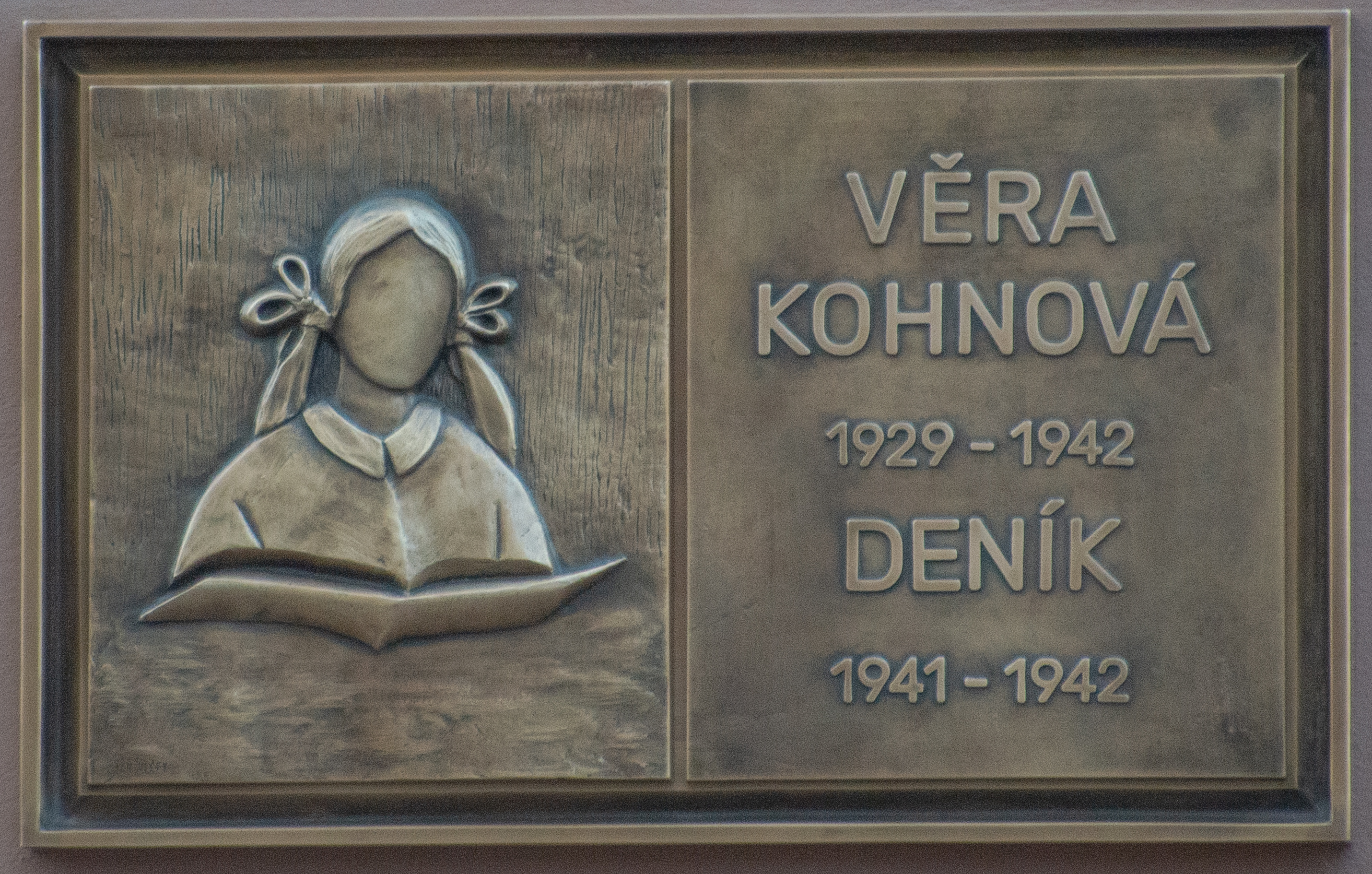
- A memorial plaque of Věra Kohnová
- Born: 26 June 1929; Plzeň, Czechoslovakia
- Died: 1942 (aged 13); Izbica Ghetto, Lublin, General Government
- Occupations: Biographer; writer

Věra Kohnová (26 June 1929 – 1942) was a Jewish girl who was deported with her family first in January 1942 from Plzeň to a concentration camp in Theresienstadt and in March 1942 to the Izbica Ghetto in Poland. Věra Kohnová became famous for her diary, which she wrote from August 1941 to January 1942. The diary, in which she watched the last months of life of the Jewish inhabitants of Plzen as a child, she stopped writing a few days before her deportation to Theresienstadt. Věra Kohnová is one of the child victims of the Holocaust. Due to her being the same age and her also writing a diary, she is often compared to Anne Frank.

== Biography ==
=== Věra Kohnová's family ===
Věra Kohnová was born on 26 June 1929 in Plzeň, the daughter of Otakar Kohn (1889–1942), an official at the Plzeň iron and metal goods company Gustav Teller. Otakar Kohn came from a family living in Týn nad Vltavou. He came to Plzeň in 1908, and in 1913 his younger brother Rudolf (1894–1942) also moved in with him. Věra Kohnová's mother's name was Melanie. Melanie Langerová was born in Dobřív near Rokycany, where her father David Langer, originally a teacher from Dolní Cetno near Mladá Boleslav, was a shopkeeper, tobacconist, and a pubkeeper. In 1912, Melanie moved with her parents to Plzeň, and in late March 1923, she married Otakar Kohn. The couple had two daughters. The first child, Hanka was born in January 1924. Věra was thus five years younger than her sister, and she celebrated her tenth birthday the same year the Germans invaded and occupied Czechoslavkia.

In addition to Rudolf Kohn, their paternal uncle, Hanka and Věra also had a maternal grandmother named Otýlie Langerová. Otýlie lived with Věra and her family in Plzeň, until she died in 1936. Věra's maternal grandfather David Langer died in 1927, before Věra's birth. Together with his wife Otýlie, he is buried in the Jewish cemetery in Rokycanská Street in Plzeň.

Before deportation to Theresienstadt, Otakar and his wife Melanie were friends with a couple named Jaromír Kalivoda and his wife Marie. Their friendship with the couple is rather obscure.

Marie Kalivodová (1912–1992), was a full twenty years younger than Věra's mother, Melanie, and was born only at a time when Melanie and her family no longer lived in Dobřív. Marie and Melanie were actually sisters. The reason why Marie was a full twenty years younger than her sister Melanie, is disputed. It is disputed whether Melanie's father David Langer, was also the father of Marie Kalivodová. Marie Kalivodová and her husband Jaromír Kalivoda were enthusiastic patriots, Sokol members, athletes, and members of the Unity of the Brethren.

On 22 January 1942, the family was put on transport "S" to Theresienstadt. The last record of Věra Kohnová comes from 11 March 1942, when she left Theresienstadt on a transport for another Nazi camp in Izbica—a transfer station to the extermination camps. She and her family arrived at Izbica two days later on 13 March. Although she and her family did not survive, her diary was hidden by Marie Kalivodová and Miroslav Matouš for 65 years.

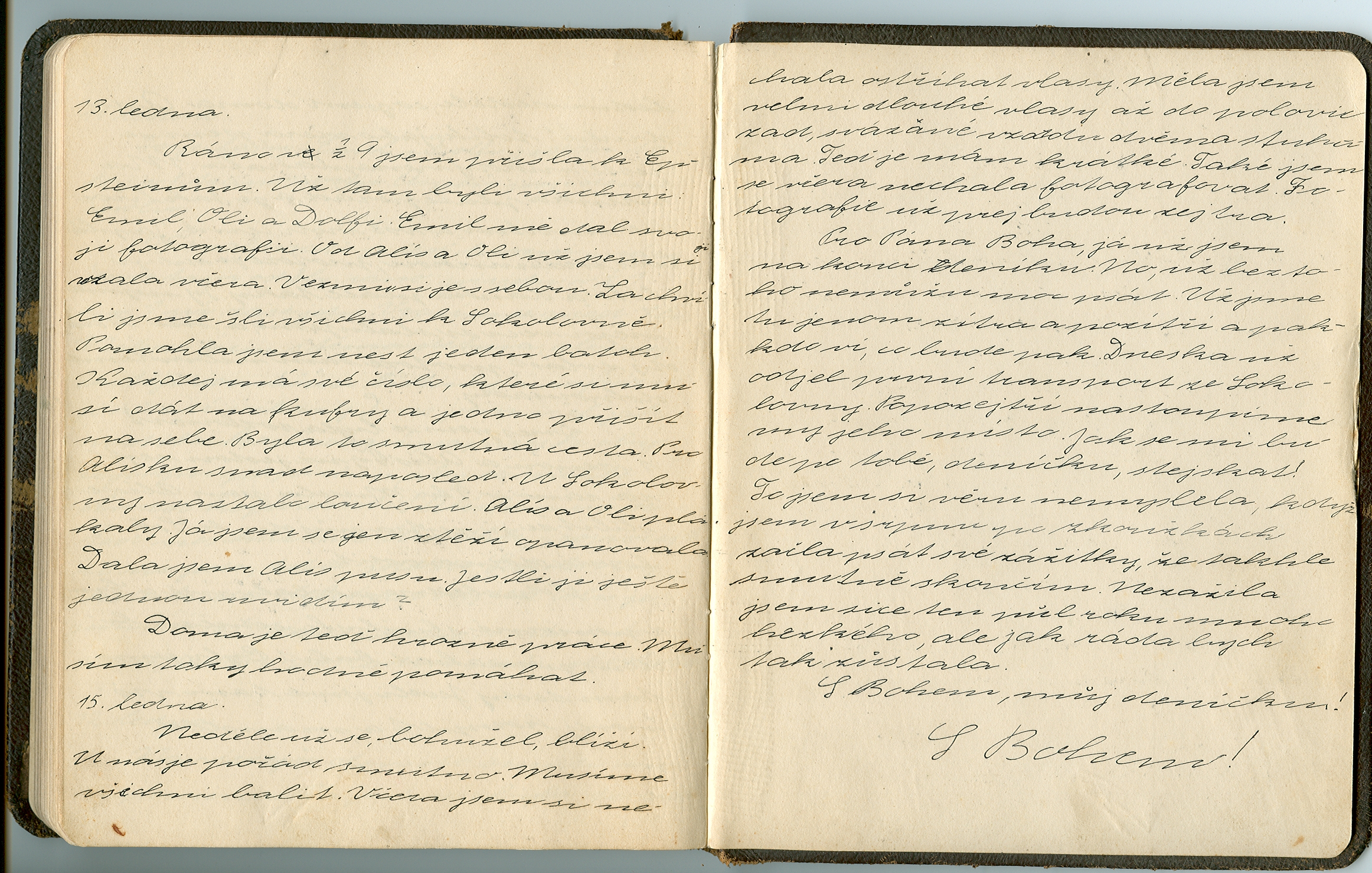
The last two pages of Věra Kohnová's diary

In 2006, the diary was published as a book in Czech, English and German (Czech title: Deník - Věra Kohnová, English: The Diary of Vera Kohnova, German: Das Tagebuch der Vera Kohnova), ISBN 80-86057-40-2. In 2023, a new edition of the diary completed with recently discovered historical facts was published (Czech title: Deník Věrky Kohnové), ISBN 978-80-267-2428-5.

== See also ==
- List of Holocaust diarists
- List of diarists
- List of posthumous publications of Holocaust victims
