= Rywka Lipszyc =

Polish-born Jewish diarist and Holocaust survivor (1929 – ?)

- Born: 15 September 1929; Łódź, Poland
- Disappeared: 10 September 1945 (aged 15); Niendorf, Timmendorfer Strand, Schleswig-Holstein, Germany
- Known for: Holocaust diarist and survivor, diary published as "The Diary of Rywka Lipszyc"

Rywka Lipszyc (pronounced as Rivka Lipshitz; 15 September 1929 – disappeared 10 September 1945) was a Polish-born Jewish diarist and Holocaust survivor. She was deported from the Łódź Ghetto to the Auschwitz-Birkenau concentration camp, followed by a transfer to Gross-Rosen and forced labor at its subcamp in Christianstadt (Krzystkowice). She was then taken on a death march to Bergen-Belsen, where the record of her life ends.

Her diary, composed of 112 pages, was handwritten in Polish between 3 October 1943 and 12 April 1944. Translated to English by Malgorzata Markoff and annotated by Ewa Wiatr, it was published for the first time in the United States in early 2014, some 70 years after it was written.

== Early life and internment in the Łódź Ghetto ==
Rywka was the eldest of four children of Yankel Lipszyc and Miriam Zelver. She was born in September 1929 in Łódź, Poland, and records show that she was still living in Łódź on January 1, 1938. She had a brother, Abram (known as Abramek), born in 1932, and two sisters, Cypora (known as Cypka), born in 1933, and Estera, (known as Tamarcia), born in 1937. The family were observant Orthodox Jews. The entire Lipszyc family was forced to move to the Łódź Ghetto in April 1940, following the German invasion of Poland. Rywka's formal education is believed to have ended at this point. She later made many mistakes in the Polish grammar, mechanics and punctuation in her diary.

In 1940, whilst walking outside in the ghetto, Rywka's father, Yan, was suddenly attacked and badly beaten by Germans. Covered in blood, he was taken to a hospital in the ghetto, where he was released two weeks later and reunited with his family. However, as a result of the beatings, he began having severe headaches and pulmonary problems which worsened over time. He died, and was buried on 2 June 1941, in the Łódź Ghetto cemetery, one year after the beatings occurred. Miriam subsequently died on 8 July 1942, possibly from lung disease and malnutrition.

Following Miriam’s death, one of Rywka's uncles took her ten-year-old brother Abramek and five-year-old sister Tamarcia. Thirteen-year-old Rywka and her nine-year-old sister Cypka went to live with their aunt Hadassah and uncle Yochanan and their three cousins on Wolborska Street. In September 1942, Yochanan, Abramek and Tamarcia were all deported to the Chełmno extermination camp. Rywka blamed herself for the loss of Abramek, saying he had given her his bread, and so he "looked bad" and was chosen to be taken away. In January 1944, she would write of the deportation of her siblings in her diary, "my heart has become a heavy stone..." She suspected, correctly, that she would never see her missing family members again.

On 11 July 1943, Rywka's aunt and guardian Hadassah died after becoming debilitated due to starvation, in spite of her daughters' and nieces' attempts to get extra food for her. Hadassah's oldest daughter, nineteen-year-old Esther (called Estusia), got legal custody of Rywka and Cypka, and they lived with Esther's sisters Channah (called Chanusia) and Minia (called Mina) in an apartment at 38 Wolborska Street. The ghetto's Juvenile Protection Committee provided some aid for the orphaned sisters Rywka and Cypka, including an extra food ration and shoes, and they got a coupon from the Rabbinate for Pesach. Rywka began keeping her diary on 3 October 1943; she was fourteen years old at the time.

== Diary keeping and deportations from the ghetto ==
Rywka kept her diary from October 1943 to April 1944. Much of her writing was about the day to day events of her life in the ghetto. She belonged to a literature club, and her friends also kept diaries and they showed them to each other. She had a job in a clothing and linen workshop on Franciszkańska Street, where, in addition to teaching sewing and clothing manufacturing skills, there were also lessons in mathematics, Hebrew and Yiddish. Rywka wrote in her diary that she hoped to be able to make a living and support a family with her sewing someday. She did not, however, like having to go to the workshop on Saturdays, since this violated the Jewish Sabbath’s prohibition on working. She was religious and had a strong faith in God even as conditions in the ghetto got worse.

In her free time, Rywka enjoyed visiting friends, going on walks, and reading books, including novels and Jewish religious texts. She and her sister Cypka read Les Misérables together, and Rywka complained that the book had "fallen apart" and that she was unable to read it while Cypka slept. She helped organize a library in the ghetto and donated two volumes of War and Peace to it. Rywka wrote that she sometimes fought with her cousins and didn't feel at home living with them. Once, during an argument with her guardian Estusia over who should bring in a bucket of water, Estusia struck her on the head and threatened to kick her out. Rywka got along very well with her sister Cypka, however, and said she felt "I have to replace her mother for her as much as I can." She advised Cypka to keep a diary of her own.

Rywka had a deep friendship with Sara Selver-Urbach, whom she called Surcia and wrote letters to in her diary. It had been Surcia's idea for Rywka to start keeping a diary. Alexandra Zapruder wrote about the girls, "Though [Rywka's] love for Surcia was certainly romantic -- she singled her out, depended deeply on her, and admired her without reserve -- it was not erotic; instead, it seemed to stem from her deep loneliness, her sense of being misunderstood, and her need to find acceptance..."

Rywka's diary ends after April 12, 1944. In the last entry she wrote, "Oh god, how much longer? I think that only when we are liberated we will enjoy a real spring. Oh, I miss this dear spring." The final paragraph is about a job eligible for people born in 1926 or 1927, and the final sentence is, "For now, I'm glad about this turn of events, because I was born in 1927, but actually". The diary entry ends in mid-sentence and the rest of the pages in the diary notebook are blank, suggesting Rywka stopped in the middle of writing the entry and never returned to it. She was born in 1929, not 1927, and it's not clear why she wrote down the wrong year of birth.

Rywka, her sister, and her three cousins were deported by cattle car to Auschwitz in August 1944, when the Łódź Ghetto was liquidated. Each deportee was allowed to take up to 20 kilograms or 44 pounds of belongings, and Rywka is known to have taken her diary. Cypka was selected for the gas immediately upon arrival. After a week in Auschwitz, Rywka and her cousins were deported to a women's forced labor camp in Christianstadt (Krzystkowice), a sub-camp of Gross-Rosen. The four young women spent six months laying sewage pipelines. In February 1945, they were sent on a death march, walking twenty-five to thirty miles a day to the Bergen-Belsen camp in Germany. They were liberated by the Allies there on 15 April 1945, the same day Chanusia died of typhus in the camp hospital.

== After the war ==
Estusia, Mina, and Rywka were temporarily nursed in a hospital before being sent to a transit camp in Lübeck, Germany. There was a plan to transport some survivors from the camp to Sweden where they would receive further medical care. Mina signed a form taking responsibility for her and Estusia's decision to go to Sweden. Mina went to look for Rywka at the hospital before their departure and found a doctor who told her Rywka only had a few days to live. Rywka was too sick to be moved. Mina and Esther left for Sweden without her, and both of them assumed she had died. Mina submitted Pages of Testimony about Rywka's presumed death to Yad Vashem twice, once in 1955 and once in 2000.

Rywka's diary was discovered near the ruins of Crematorium III at Auschwitz-Birkenau in June 1945 by a Red Army doctor, Zinaida Berezovskaya, who took it with her back to the Soviet Union and kept it hidden at her home in Omsk. She made repeated attempts to have it translated but could not find anyone who would do it. Berezovskaya died in 1983. The diary was kept by her son along with other war memorabilia. He died in 1992.

Berezovskaya's granddaughter, during a visit to Russia in 1995, found the diary among her late father's belongings at his home in Moscow and took it home with her to San Francisco. Her father had never mentioned the diary to her. It was wrapped in a cover note and a Russian language newspaper article, with a February 1945 photo showing the exact spot where Berezovskaya had found the diary. In 2008, Berezovskaya's granddaughter showed the diary to the Jewish Family and Children's Services of San Francisco Holocaust Center (JFCS Holocaust Center). The diary was stored in relatively good condition before it was offered. Researcher Judy Janec, who was the director of the Tauber Holocaust Library and Archives at the JFCS Holocaust Center, and Wojciech Płosa, the head of archive at the Auschwitz-Birkenau State Museum, both believe it was found and buried by the Sonderkommando, who buried numerous manuscripts in an attempt to leave evidence of the Nazis' crimes behind. Eight of these manuscripts were unearthed after the war.

After Rywka's diary was given to the JFCS Holocaust Center, historians researched her life and determined Rywka did not die right after her cousins left for Sweden, as they had thought she had. On 25 July 1945, she was sent to a hospital in Niendorf, about eighteen miles north of Lübeck. On 10 September 1945, records show that Rywka was still alive and was still being nursed in the Niendorf hospital. This is the last indication of her whereabouts; there is no documentation as to whether she died or was discharged, and no mention of Rywka's name in any of the municipal or cemetery records. The Jewish cemetery in Lübeck has a list of displaced persons who were buried there, but Rywka's name wasn't on it.

The diary, with the title The Diary of Rywka Lipszyc, was published in English in early 2014 by the JFCS Holocaust Center in partnership with Lehrhaus Judaica house of learning in Berkeley, California. It is edited by Alexandra Zapruder, accompanied by essays written by scholar Fred Rosenbaum, and Rywka's cousin Hadassa Halamish. In 2017, the diary was also published in Polish. The diary was also the subject of a moving exhibit that had appeared in various venues throughout the United States, including at the Jewish Museum Milwaukee in Wisconsin and the Illinois Holocaust Museum and Education Center in Skokie, Illinois, as of 2023.

Rywka Lipszyc is not to be confused with Rywka Lipszyc, recorded in the Database of Shoah Victims (1888–1940), who died in the Łódź Ghetto, wife of Yekhiel. Sara Selver-Urbach survived the Holocaust and would move to Israel and would write a memoir, Through the Window of My Home: Recollections from the Lodz Ghetto.

== See also ==
- The Diary of a Young Girl by Anne Frank
- Zalmen Gradowski
- Yitskhok Rudashevski
- Dawid Sierakowiak
