= Rococo painting =

18th-century European style of painting

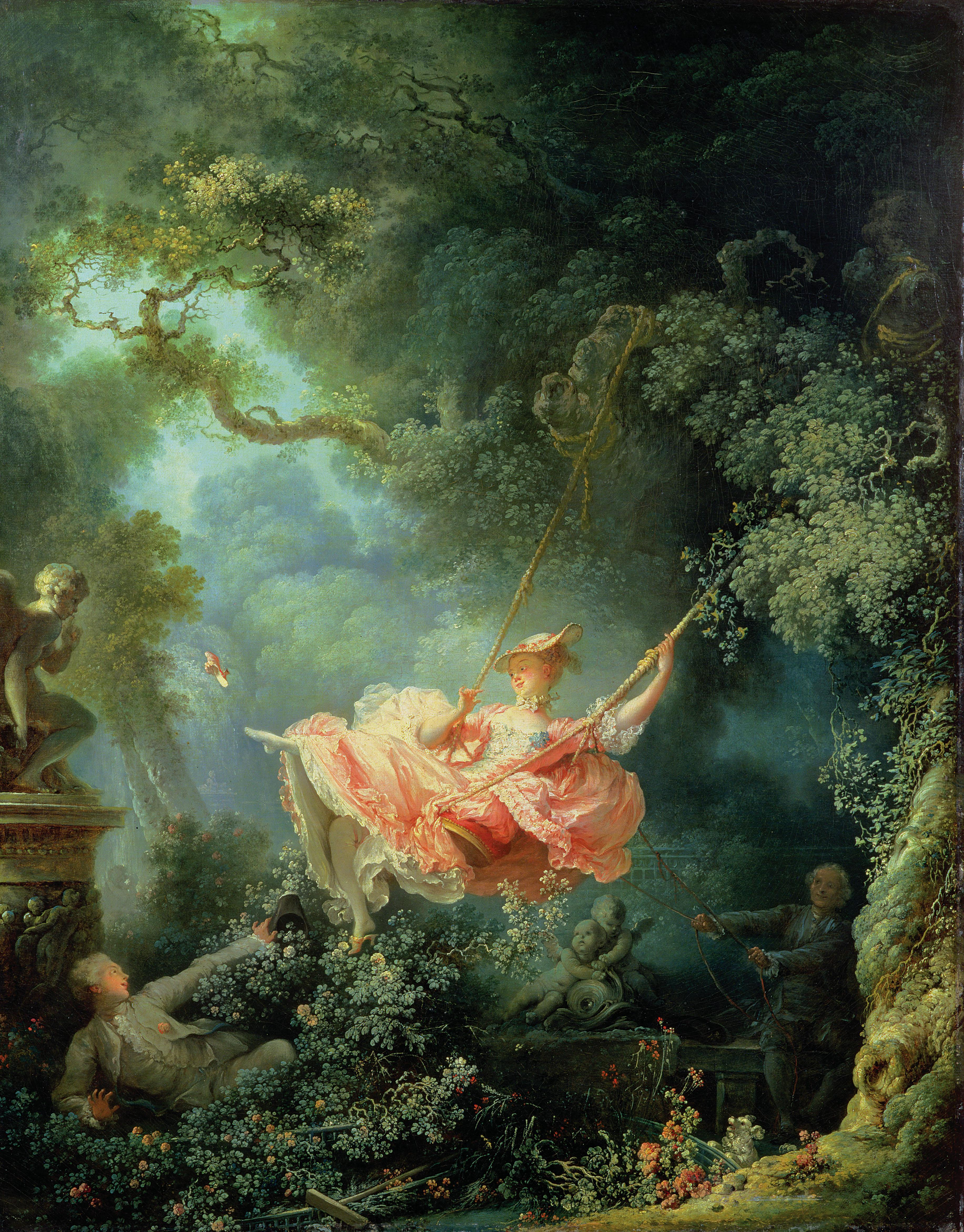
Jean-Honoré Fragonard: The swing, 1766

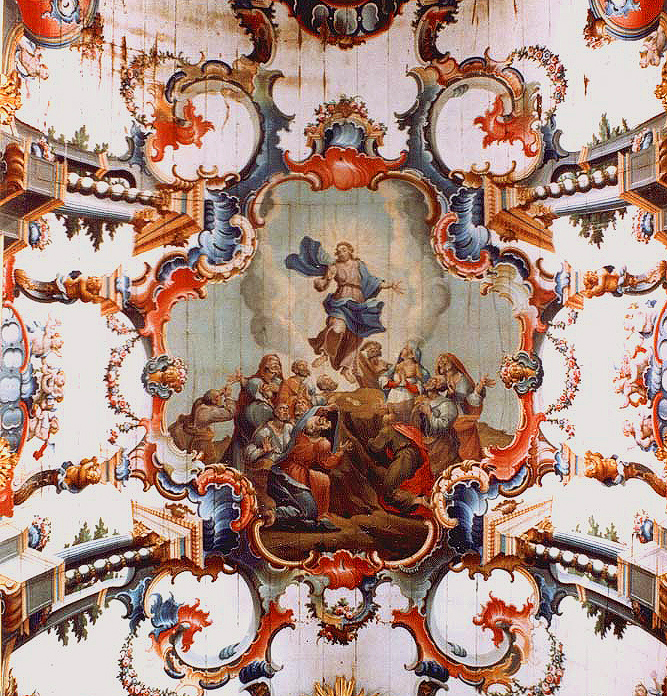
Master Ataíde: Ascension of Jesus, 1827

Rococo painting represents the expression in painting of an aesthetic movement that flourished in Europe between the early and late 18th century, migrating to America and surviving in some regions until the mid-19th century. The painting of this movement is divided into two sharply differentiated camps. One forms an intimate, carefree visual document of the way of life and worldview of the eighteenth-century European elites, and the other, adapting constituent elements of the style to the monumental decoration of churches and palaces, served as a means of glorifying faith and civil power.

Rococo was born in Paris around the 1700s, as a reaction of the French aristocracy against the sumptuous, palatial, and solemn Baroque practiced in the period of Louis XIV. It was characterized above all by its hedonistic and aristocratic character, manifested in delicacy, elegance, sensuality, and grace, and in the preference for light and sentimental themes, where curved line, light colors, and asymmetry played a fundamental role in the composition of the work. From France, where it assumed its most typical feature and where it was later recognized as national heritage, Rococo soon spread throughout Europe, but significantly changing its purposes and keeping only the external form of the French model, with important centers of cultivation in Germany, England, Austria, and Italy, with some representation also in other places, such as the Iberian Peninsula, the Slavic and Nordic countries, even reaching the Americas.

Despite its value as an autonomous work of art, Rococo painting was often conceived as an integral part of an overall concept of interior decoration. It began to be criticized from the mid-18th century, with the rise of the Enlightenment, neoclassical and bourgeois ideals, surviving until the French Revolution, when it fell into complete disrepute, accused of being superficial, frivolous, immoral, and purely decorative. From the 1830s on, it was again recognized as an important testimony to a certain phase of European culture and the lifestyle of a specific social stratum, and as a valuable asset for its own unique artistic merit, where questions about aesthetics were raised that would later flourish and become central to modern art.

== Origins and characteristics of the style ==
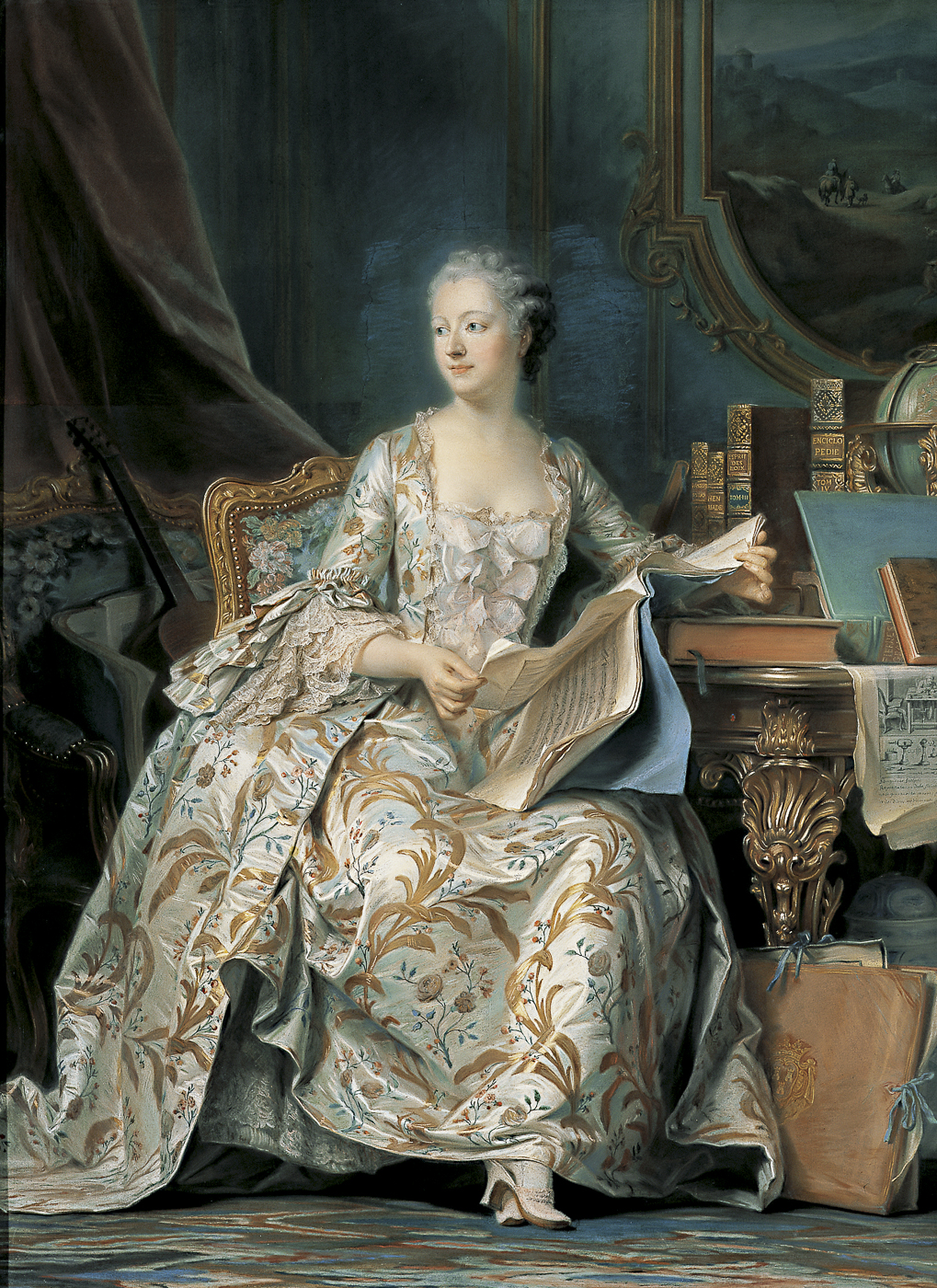
Maurice-Quentin de La Tour: Madame de Pompadour in her Study, 1755

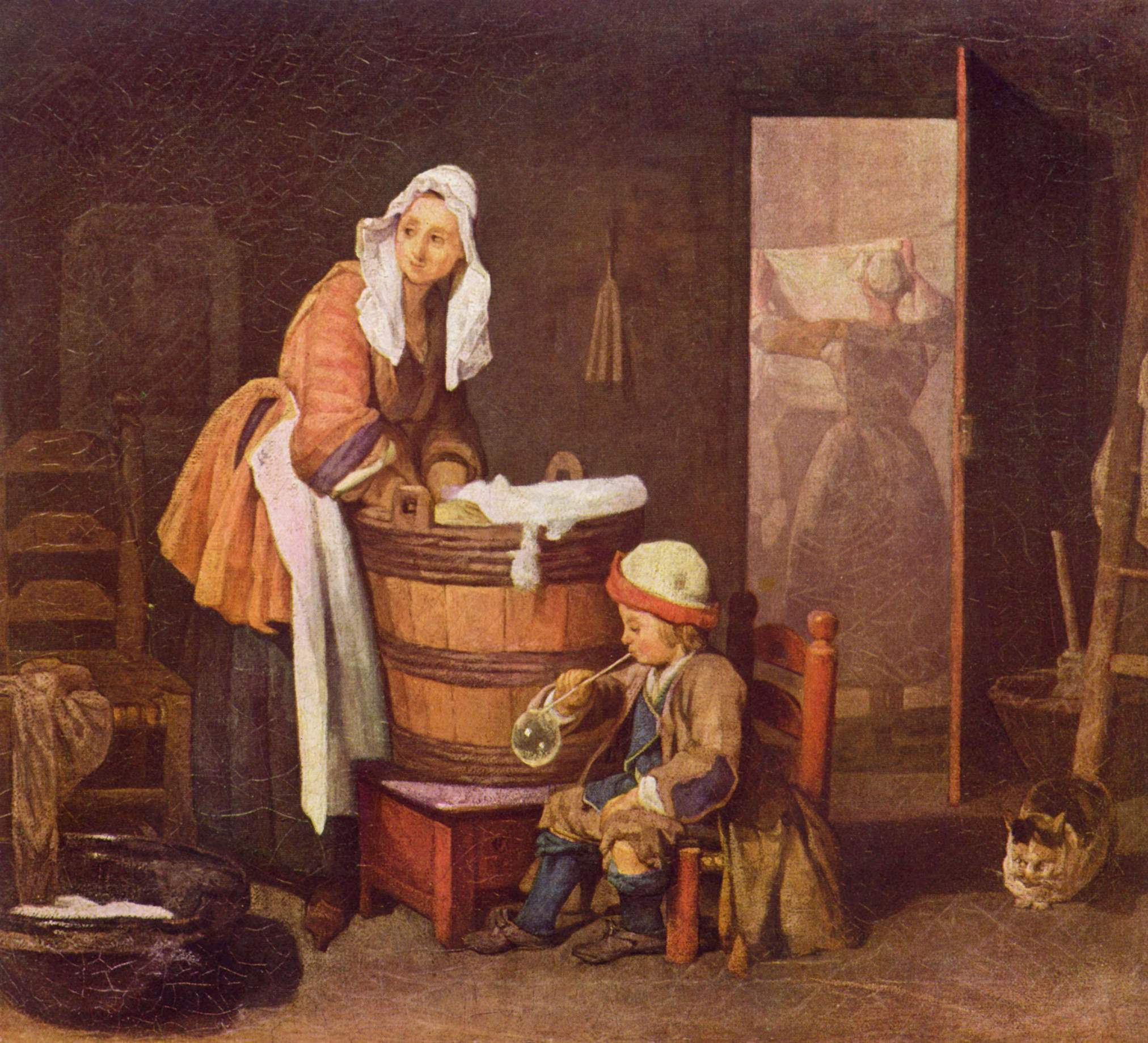
Jean-Baptiste-Siméon Chardin: The Laundress, 1735. An example of the coetaneous but opposed Rococo current

Rococo developed from the growing freedom of thought that was being born in 18th century France. The death of Louis XIV in 1715 opened space for a flexibilization of French culture, until then strongly ceremonial and dominated by representations that aimed above all the praise of the king and his power and manifested themselves in a grandiloquent and pompous way. The disappearance of the very personification of absolutism enabled the nobility to regain some of the power and influence that had been centered on the person of the monarch, and the court at Versailles emptied, with many nobles moving to their estates in the countryside, while others moved to palaces in Paris, which became the center of "salon culture," sophisticated, glittering, and hedonistic social gatherings that took place amid literary and artistic discussions. This empowerment of the nobility then made it the main patron of artists of the period.

In these salons, the Rococo aesthetic was formed, which displaced from the center of interest historical painting, which was previously the most prestigious genre and which invoked a typically masculine ethical, civic and heroic sense, putting in its place the painting of domestic and country scenes, or of gentle allegories inspired by classical myths, where many identify the prevalence of the feminine universe. In this sense, the role played by women in the society of this phase was very relevant, assuming a force in politics throughout Europe and proving to be generous patrons of art and shapers of taste, the case of the royal mistresses Madame de Pompadour and Madame du Barry, of the empresses Catherine the Great and Maria Theresa of Austria, and organizing several important salons, such as Madame Geoffrin, Madame d'Épinay, and Madame de Lespinasse, among many others. However, in many respects the Rococo is a simple continuation, indeed a culmination, of Baroque values – the taste for the splendid, for movement and asymmetry, the frequent allusion to Greco-Roman mythology, the emotional bent, the ostentatious pretension, and the conventionalism, in the sense of being governed by pre-established criteria accepted by consensus. Rococo painting also illustrates, in its first version, the social schism that would lead to the French Revolution, and represents the last symbolic bastion of resistance of an elite distant from the problems and interests of the common people, and that was increasingly threatened by the rise of the middle class, which was educated and began to dominate the economy and even important sectors of the art market and culture in general. With this, it determined the parallel emergence of a much more realistic and austere stylistic current, whose theme was all bourgeois and popular, exemplified by the artists Jean-Baptiste Greuze and Jean-Baptiste Chardin, and which was virtually ignored by the rococo universe, with few exceptions, but which would ultimately end up being one of the forces for its collapse at the end of the 18th century.

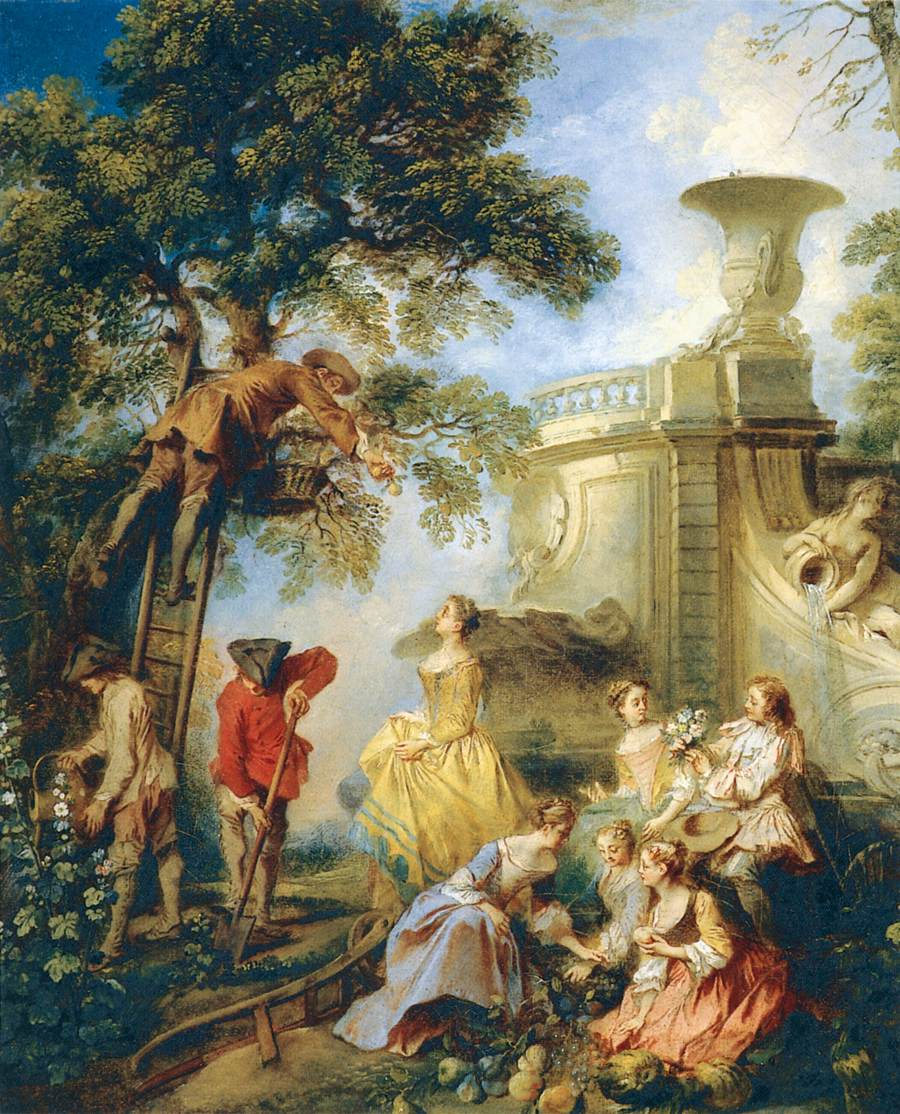
Nicolas Lancret: The Earth, c. 1730

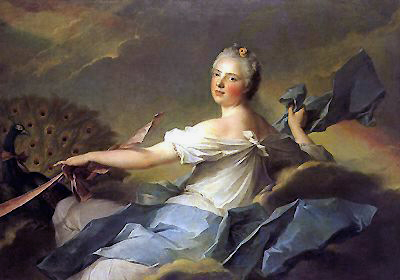
Jean-Marc Nattier: Princess Marie Adélaïde of France – The Air, 1751

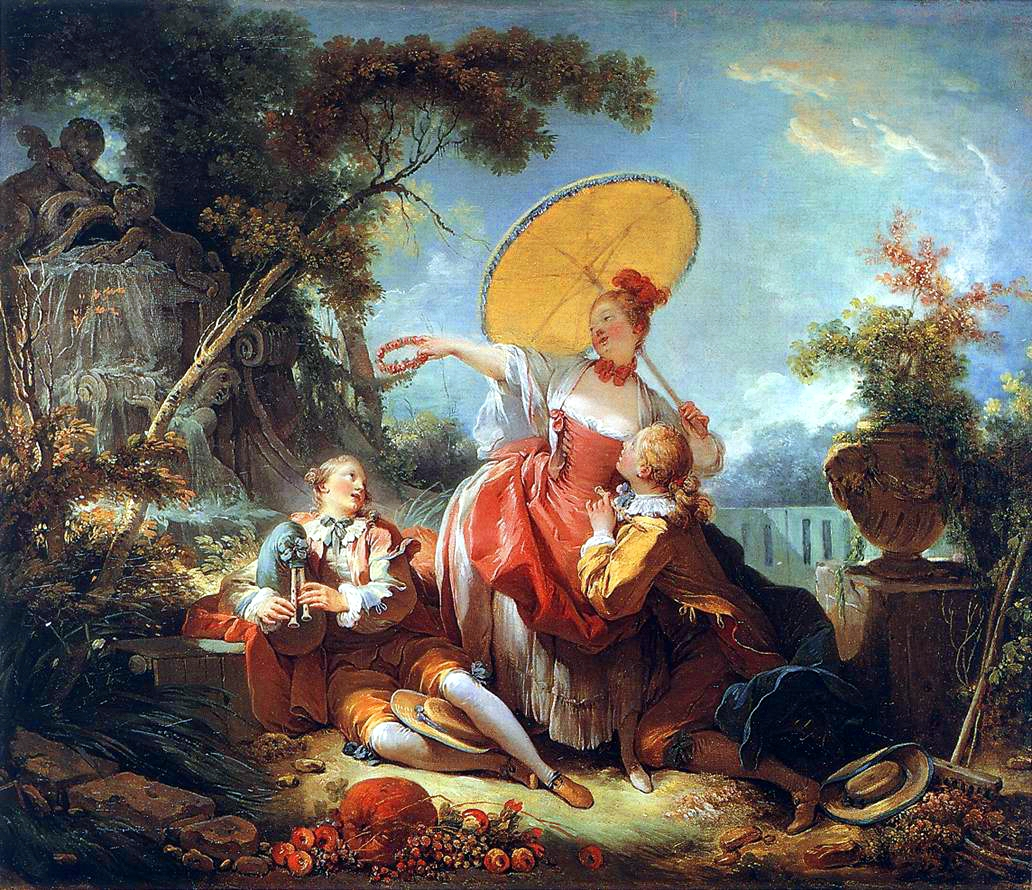
Jean-Honoré Fragonard: The crowned amorous, or The musical contest

In a period in which the old traditions were beginning to dissolve, rococo painting represents an opposition to the academic doctrine, which tried, even during the high Baroque and especially in France, to impose a classicist artistic model as a timeless and universally valid principle, whose authority was placed above questioning, just as political theory validated absolutism. In this wave of liberalism and relativism, art began to be seen as just one more thing among so many that were subject to the fluctuations of fashion and the times, a view that would have been inconceivable until recently. As a result, the inclinations of the period tended toward the human and the sentimental, directing production not toward heroes or demigods, but toward ordinary people, with their weaknesses, and who sought pleasure. The representation of power and grandeur is abandoned, and the public of rococo painting seeks to see in it rather beauty, love, and the relaxed and captivating grace, excluding all rhetoric and drama. For this the classical tradition was still of use, by offering for the artists' inspiration a body of themes quite attractive and suitable for the hedonistic and refined mentality of the elites, who rejected all austerity and reinterpreted the classical past in the light of the ideal and bucolic Arcadia, of the fantasy of a Golden Age where nature and civilization, sensuality and intelligence, beauty and spirituality were harmoniously identified. Neither this theme nor this interpretation were, in fact, new; they had existed since the Roman Empire and remained present in Western culture almost without interruption since their origin, both as a simple romantic and poetic artifice and as a resource for psychological escape when times proved hostile or excessively sophisticated, thus becoming a powerful symbol of freedom. In the Rococo period the innovative note was that of the world of the Arcadian shepherds and the gods of the Greco-Latin pantheon virtually only the backdrop of the natural environment remained, this "natural" being more often than not a cultivated garden, and the protagonists of the moment were the aristocrats and the enriched bourgeois themselves, with all their fashionable apparatus, engaged in brilliant conversation and whose heroism was summed up in amorous conquest, embodying the pastoral idea more in keeping with the conventions of a social theater. In representation, just as the Baroque was prolix, the pastoral Rococo is succinct; despite the uniqueness of setting, formally the painting is an accumulation of discontinuities, and what most confers the effect of unity is atmosphere rather than description. In this way, the Rococo appears as the link between the ceremonious classicism of the late Baroque and the sentimental pre-Romanticism of the middle class.

This fantasy universe was also in line with the conceptions of the time about the illusionistic nature of art. For the critics of that time, the pleasure that art can provide is only possible when the spectator accepts the terms of the game and submits to being illuded by a kind of magic. The problematic involved in artistic illusion was not unprecedented, and the question whether an activity based on imitation and lure of the senses could be morally justified or worthy of intellectual attention has accompanied European thought since the questioning of Plato, Socrates, and Aristotle in Ancient Greece. During the 18th century, this topic took on a new color in the deliberate quest to somehow confuse and disorient the audience, removing them from the circumstantial and concrete to throw them into the ambiguous and fluent world of the theater of representation, a practice that otherwise did not find unanimous support and was criticized by many moralists, concerned about the concomitant dissolution of the sense of reality and the firmness of ethical values encouraged by these paintings. Likewise, not all artists had this goal. Important painters of the time, more engaged in an idea of reforming and moralizing art, such as Hogarth and Goya, strove to overcome the conventions of illusionism and help the public restore, as Matthew Craske puts it, "the clarity of their vision." Thus, one finds positions with varying degrees of closeness to or distance from objective reality, in a dialectic that provided much of the strength for the creativity of this period. It is also important to point out that, according to the sophisticated culture of the aristocracy, civilization was a necessarily artificial phenomenon, and an educated and polished spectator was expected to be able to make the subtle distinctions between the real and the fictional, to be able to deal with the complexities of art, and to be able to defend himself from crude charlatanism and cheap illusion, indicating the cultivation of his intellect and his erudite baggage.

Another important contribution to the formulation of Rococo aesthetics was the establishment of the concept of art for art's sake initiated by Alexander Baumgarten in 1750 and further developed by Kant in the following decade. He stated that the main goal of art was pleasure, not utility, conceiving the aesthetic experience as coming from the contemplation of the beauty of an object, and understood as the sensual stimulation of undifferentiated thoughts, devoid of utility or purpose and detached from morality. For Kant, ideal beauty does not declare itself completely, but rather remains constantly arousing ideas without exhausting them. Thus meaning is not in the determination of any one concept, but in the incessant dialogue between imagination and understanding. This is why he qualified art as a "serious game," seeing in it aspects of playfulness such as freedom and disinterest. In this way, the Rococo definitely raises in Western art the question of aestheticism, in the very ambiguity that surrounds its representational method and its essential goals, making clear the primordial convention that if painting exists, it exists for an observer and to be looked at, but handing over to future generations the serious problem of, according to Stephen Melville, "to say that what happens to a viewer in front of a painting is fundamentally different from what happens to a person looking at a wallpaper or a landscape through a window," a dialectical element that would become crucial to the modern discussion and validation of art itself, of artistic making and understanding, and of the autonomy of Aesthetics, and which has not yet been satisfactorily resolved.

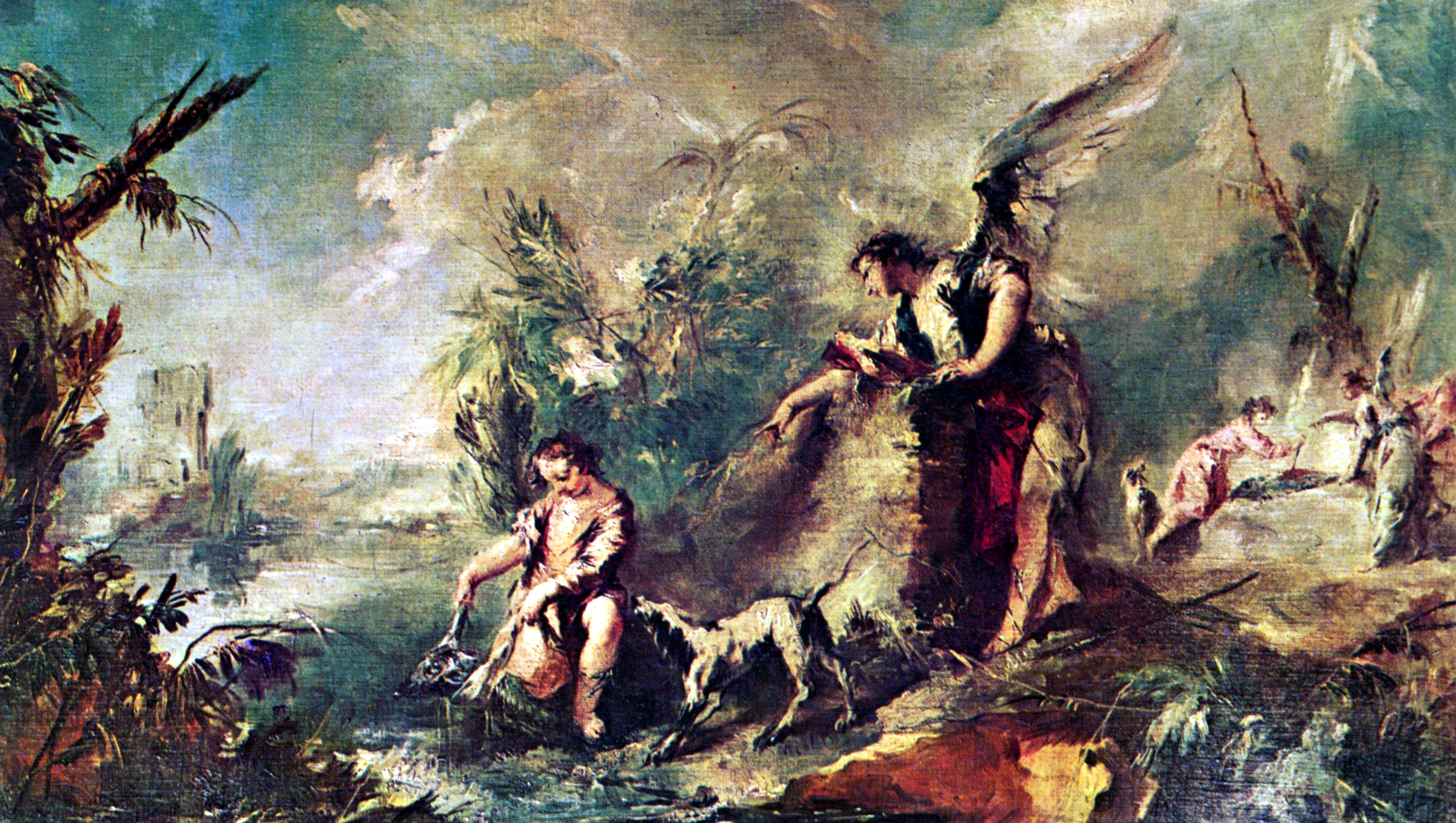
Tobias and the Raphael Angel, Church of the Raphael Angel, Venice, by Francesco Guardi, showing a lively and elegant brushstroke

Technically, Rococo painting tends toward a greater freedom than in Baroque or academic painting. The brush strokes are clear and nimble, with the creation of textures and an effect sometimes similar to that of impressionist paintings, giving many compositions an aspect of sketch, of unfinished, which engaged the viewer more efficiently, asking him to mentally complete what had been presented schematically. Realistic detailing and the primacy of line are denied, the perspective of space is shortened, creating a more enclosed setting, the backdrops are more simplified, favoring the foreground, and suggestive effects of atmosphere are sought. The representation of the clothing, however, tends to be real enough to show the sumptuousness of the fabrics and the richness of the jewelry and ornaments worn by the models. As for color, a central aspect in the Rococo, the concern of its artists reached extremes of complexity. Manuals for amateurs and beginners written at the time, instead of giving gradual instructions on combinations of primary colors, jumped directly to mixing schemes with dozens and dozens of gradations, and the refinement in this area, at the level of professionals, was naturally much sharper, even developing its own symbolism involving each type of tone.

=== The sacred and monumental Rococo ===
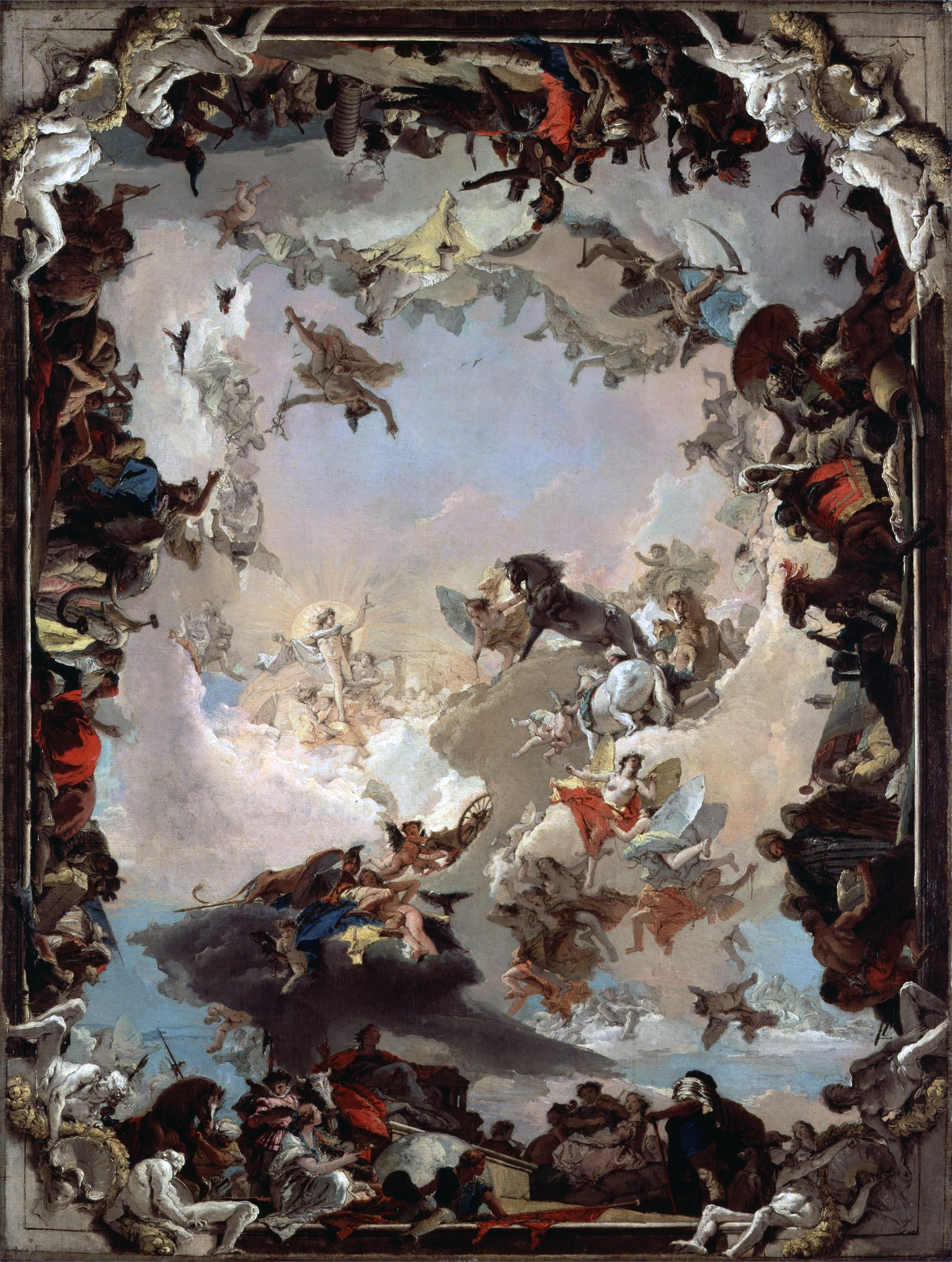
Giovanni Battista Tiepolo, Allegory of the Planets and Continents, 1752

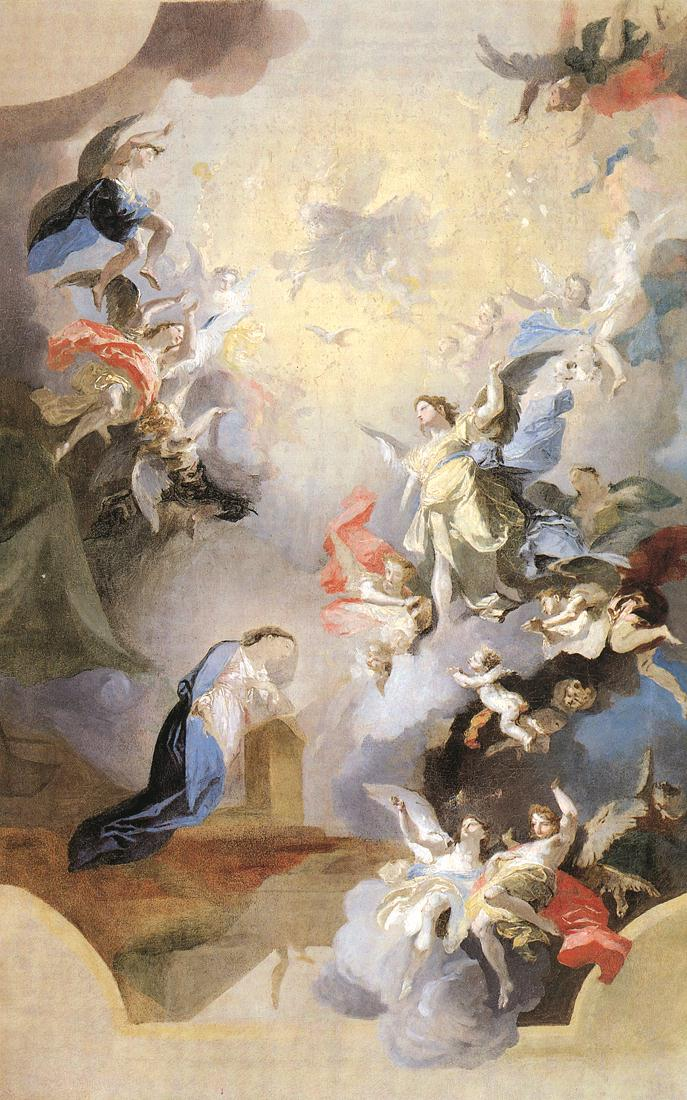
Franz Anton Maulbertsch, Annunciation (study), 1794

Rococo painting was not an exclusively domestic phenomenon, and found fertile ground also in the decoration of public buildings and churches. In these environments, Rococo painting entered as an important element in the composition of a "total work of art," integrating the architecture with the furniture and the accessory decorative objects, such as silverware and stuccoes, and signaling the functionality of the space. In France and England, the Rococo took a mainly profane form, but in other regions of Catholic Europe, especially in southern Germany, it left admirable religious monuments, the same happening in Brazil, where painters from the Minas Gerais region, led by Master Ataíde, formulated through a late Rococo and naive flavor the first school of national painting, and constituting, in the opinion of Victor-Lucien Tapié, one of the happiest fruits of the style in the religious sphere.

The preoccupation of the illustrated but unoccupied elites with happiness and pleasure, accompanied by a decline in the influence of religion, which draw the rococo atmosphere, might, at first impression, problematize the application of the style to religious art, which catered rather to the needs of the lower classes and whose devotion had been in no way affected by the uprooted customs of the elites. The apparent contradictions at once were resolved by Christian moralists in associating the happiness desired by the senses with the happiness provided by a virtuous life, asserting that human pleasure is one of God's gifts and suggesting that divine love is also the source of a kind of sensory lust. With this accommodation, religion, previously burdened by the notion of guilt and the threats of the fire and eternal damnation, takes on an optimistic and positive tone, and generates a painting before which the faithful could pray "in hope and joy" and which serves as a bridge between earthly and heavenly happiness. Rococo, employed in ecclesiastical decoration, was part of the secularization movement that the Catholic Church had been experiencing since the Baroque, removing various obstacles between the sacred and the profane, and served as a new and more engaging way to celebrate the mysteries of faith, but its ornamentalism was also seen by some as a distraction from the primary purposes of sacramental gathering.

== Regional Schools ==
=== France ===
Antoine Watteau: The Embarkation for Cythera, Louvre version, 1717

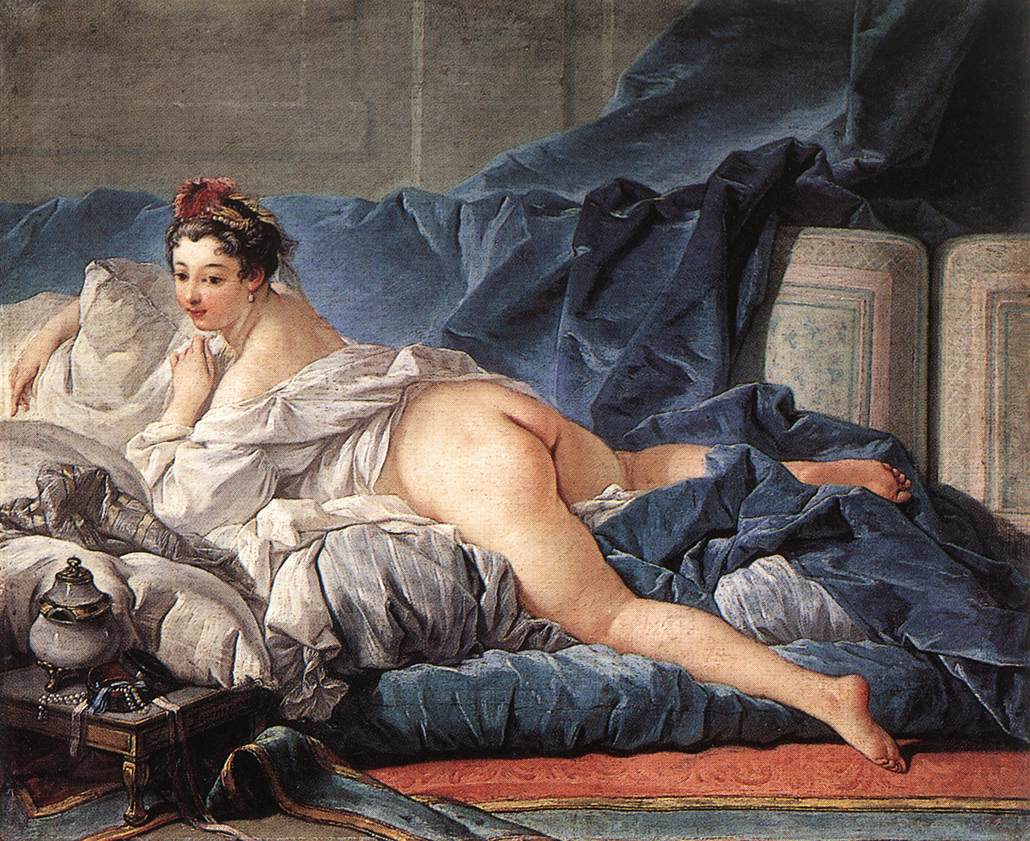
François Boucher: Odalisque, 1745

In France, the Rococo showed its most characteristic face, in a light, gallant and sensual treatment of its privileged themes, the pastoral, followed by allegorical scenes and portraits. Its figures are richly dressed, set against country backdrops, gardens or parks, a model typified in the Fête galante (elegant feast), illustrated so well in Watteau's work, where the aristocrats spend their time in sophisticated entertainments in a dreamy atmosphere not devoid of erotic connotations, reminiscent of the idyllic world supposed to exist in classical antiquity. Rococo painting is above all intimate, not intended for the general public, but for the consumption of the illustrated and idle nobility and the wealthier bourgeoisie, and had an eminently decorative character, drawing much inspiration from classical literature. The technique is agile and tends toward virtuosity, with free brushstrokes that in a way prefigure Impressionism and a rich color palette, but with a predominance of light tones, seeking subtle and evocative effects of atmosphere.

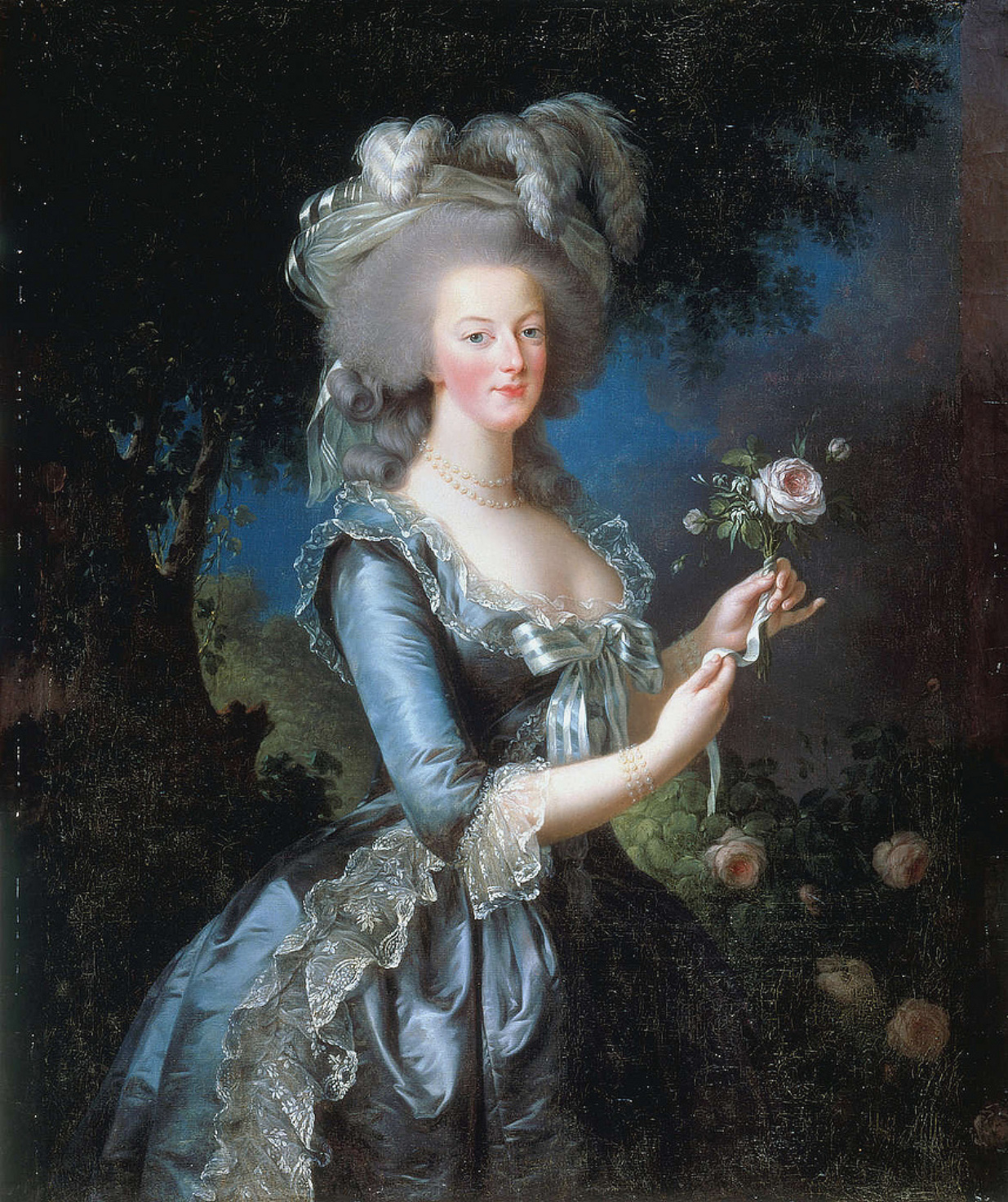
Elisabeth Vigée-Le Brun: Queen Marie Antoinette, 1783

The decorativism of Rococo painting draws its substance from the rich ornamentation common in many works, the profusion of details represented in detail, the sophisticated chromaticism, the wealth of costumes and scenery, to the point of becoming a value in itself, in compositions that even lose their narrative focus amidst the voluptuousness of pure plasticity, the immediate sensory appeal. Speaking of an important work by Watteau, The Embarkation for Cythera, considered a paradigm of the aesthetics of pleasure typical of the Rococo, the island being the birthplace of Venus, Norman Bryson says that the painter's style provides just enough narrative content to suggest a particular reading of the work, but not to exhaust it, establishing a "semantic vacuum" that initiates a practice of dissociation between the reference text and the painting that illustrates it that prefigures modernity, minimizing dependence on the literary source for artistic creation in other fields, and, according to Catherine Cusset, replacing psychological or metaphysical content with a "plethora of ideas.

In this aesthetic of pleasure, sensuality had special appeal, but not as a narrative component of pure eroticism; rather, it provided a pretext for artists to explore the limits of representation, aiming for a tangibility that would elicit a more immediate and intense global sensory response, which was one of the parameters for the qualification of a work of art at that time, and inscribed in a broader conception of life where the carefree pleasure of living was the keynote. More suggesting than explaining, more inviting to the public's complementary fantasy than presenting it in its entirety, which would be considered offensive, the eroticism in rococo painting is more penetrating and efficient than in compositions where the meaning is exhausted from the start by the obviousness of direct references. Even with this dominant aura more of suggestion and insinuation, examples of cruder eroticism are also found, especially in the work of François Boucher, one of the great masters of the Rococo, who, according to Arnold Hauser, made his fame and fortune "painting breasts and buttocks" and thus approached a more popular universe, although he was equally capable of staying within the limits of public decency at other times and creating pieces of great dignity and delicate charm.

The other great French figure is Jean-Honoré Fragonard, a pupil of Boucher and an accomplished colorist who continued the tradition of poetic and sensual allegories of his predecessors, but was also appreciated by his contemporaries for the enormous versatility he showed, adapting to the needs of a wide variety of subjects and genres, amassing enormous fortune from the sale of his works but facing poverty after the Revolution. In the rehabilitation of the Rococo in the 19th century, he was called "the Cherubino of erotic painting," and praised in high terms for his ability to create effects of emotional suspension and sensual tension without falling into the indecorous. Finally, several other names in French Rococo deserve attention: Jean-Marc Nattier, the three Van Loo (Jean-Baptiste, Louis-Michel, and Charles-André), Maurice Quentin de La Tour, Jean-Baptiste Perronneau, François Lemoyne, Elisabeth Vigée Le Brun, Jean-Baptiste Pater, Alexander Roslin, and Nicolas Lancret among many others.

=== England ===
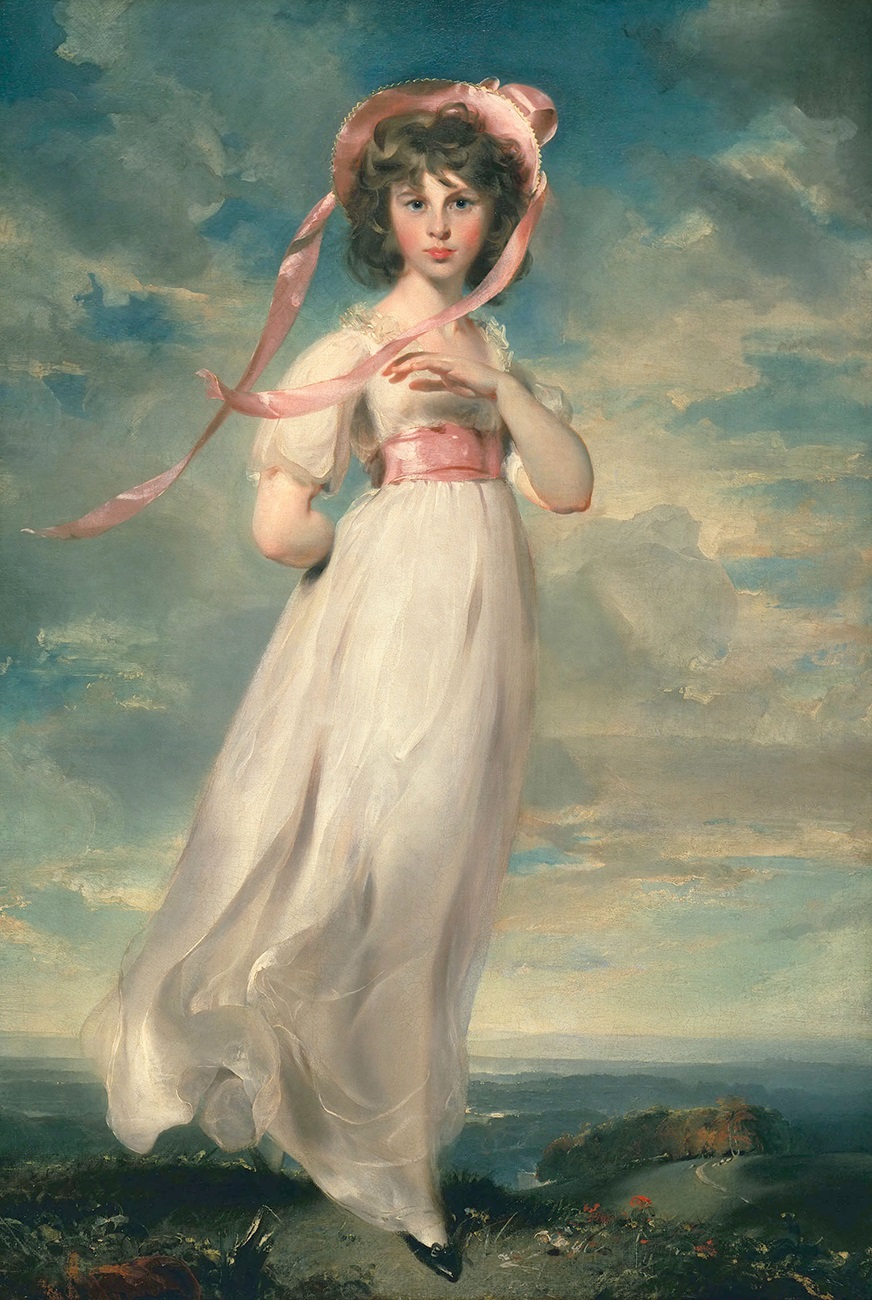
Sir Thomas Lawrence: Sarah Barrett Moulton: Pinkie, 1794

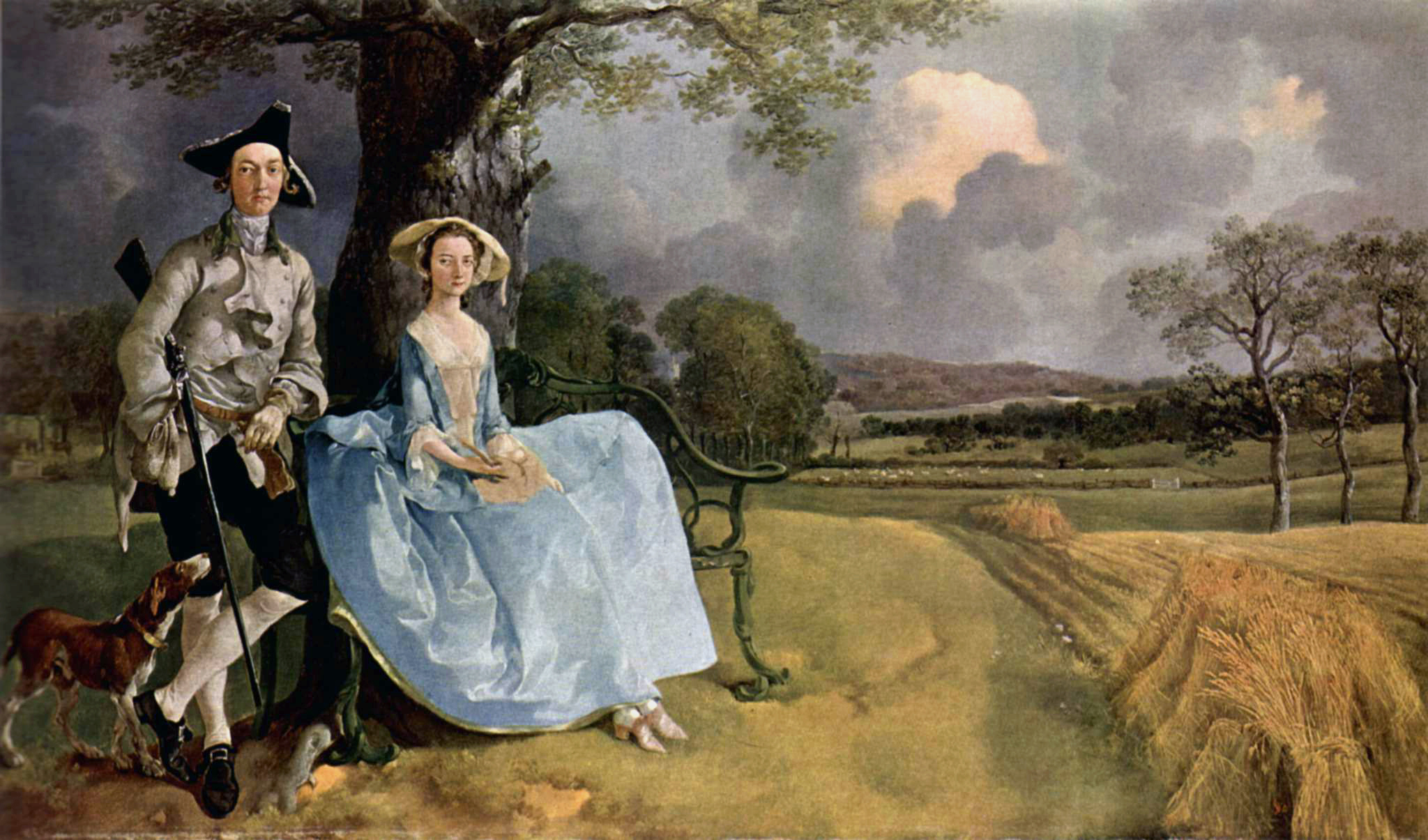
Thomas Gainsborough: Portrait of Mr and Mrs Andrews, 1749

The English social system differed in several points from the continental model. The aristocracy formed by the nobles and the rich merchants also dominated power there, but strove to implement a fully capitalist system that solicited – and obtained – the concurrence of the bourgeoisie, who knew that their objectives were common and identified with those of the state, for their own benefit and that of the nation. There was no mythical aura surrounding noble birth, social stratification was more elastic, often linking commoners to the nobility through marriage, and its lower strata showed a fairly homogeneous group that in practice was little different from the middle class. Another distinctive feature was that in England it was the nobles who paid most of the taxes, but in France they were exempt from all taxes. In addition, a considerable reading public was forming in England among the commoners, who were better informed about general facts, politics, and even art than in other regions, through the increasing dissemination of books and the circulation of various popular periodicals. These factors gave English society a freedom of expression unknown in other European countries, and made the country the world leader in the next century.

The English Rococo was imported from France, and since its introduction became a fashion, but the reception of the style in England was not without contradictions, since historically the relations between the two countries were marked by conflict. The elites, however, taking advantage of a period of peace, knew how to separate political and aesthetic issues, visiting France as tourists, encouraging the migration of French craftsmen, and importing large quantities of decorative objects and rococo art pieces, while the rest of the population tended to view everything French with disdain. On this popular base appeared satirical writers like Jonathan Swift, and artists like William Hogarth, with series of canvases and prints of strong social criticism such as The Career of the Libertine and Marriage à la mode, crudely exposing in a robust and frankly narrative painting the vices of the Francophile elite. In thematic terms he was an isolated case, and the reaction to his works by the elite was, predictably, negative, but as a symptom of the times, formally his personal style owes much to France. The art market was completely bent to foreign fashions, and local artists had to accept the situation by largely adopting the principles of French Rococo. The most popular genres in England were portraiture and "conversation paintings," scenes showing groups of friends or family engaged in conversation, a typology that combined portraiture with landscape painting, introduced by the immigrant Philippe Mercier and possibly inspired by Watteau's Fêtes galantes. The genre was also cultivated by Francis Hayman, Arthur Devis, and Thomas Gainsborough, perhaps the most typical and brilliant painter of the English Rococo. Gainsborough also practiced pure landscape painting, where he developed a style of simplifying the scenery, of nonspecific and theatricalized description, and of altering its basic colors and sense of perspective, artificialisms typical of the Rococo, besides having left behind important work in the field of portraiture. Mention should also be made of the German immigrant Johan Zoffany, owner of an original style, creating complex interior settings crammed with works of art and group portraits, and Thomas Lawrence, a late representative of the Rococo and celebrated portraitist, whose career extends into Romanticism, but who initially left works of extraordinary charm and jovial grace.

=== Italy and Germanic countries ===
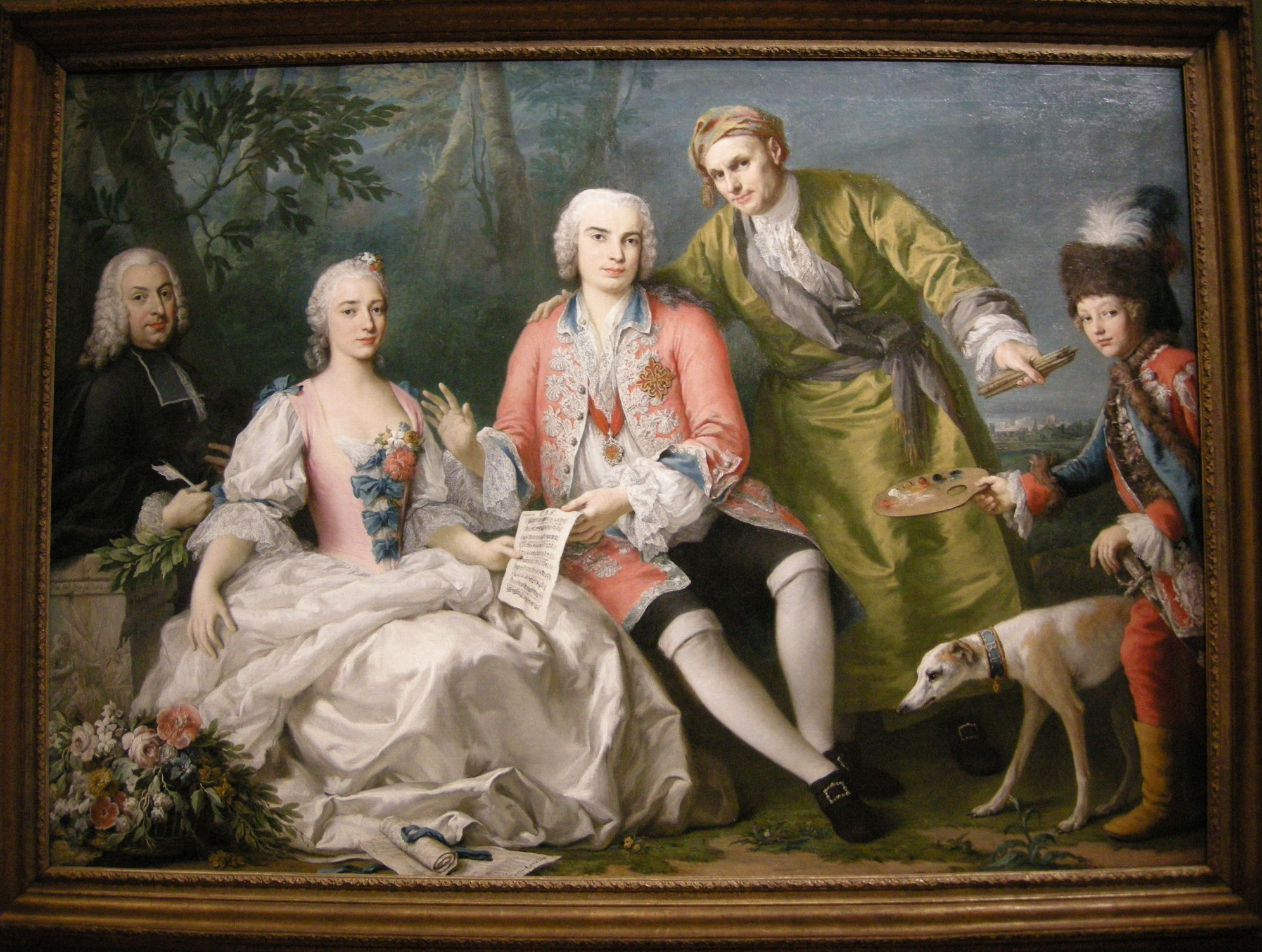
The singer Farinelli with friends, c. 1750–52, by Jacopo Amigoni

Although much of the Germanic Rococo owes directly to France, its main source is the development of the Italian Baroque, and in these countries the distinction between Rococo and Baroque is more difficult and subjective. In Italy, home of the Baroque, this style continued to meet the needs of the local sensibility, and the model of the French Rococo was not followed in its essence, but changed its thematic scope and its significant emphases, expressing itself mainly in monumental decoration. In the field of painting the greatest Rococo flowering took place in Venice, around the dominant figure of Giovanni Battista Tiepolo, a celebrated muralist who left important works also north of the Alps and in Spain. His personal style was a continuation of the native Baroque, but he adopted a light and luminous color palette, and built lively, agile forms full of grace and movement, which place him perfectly in the orbit of the Rococo, although his tone is always elevated, if not apotheotic, and his theme always either sacred or glorifying. Other Italian names worth remembering are Sebastiano Ricci, Francesco Guardi, Francesco Zugno, Giovanni Antonio Pellegrini, Giovanni Domenico Tiepolo, Michele Rocca, and Pietro Longhi, with a varied theme that ranged from the domestic scene to the urban landscape, including mythological allegories and sacred works.

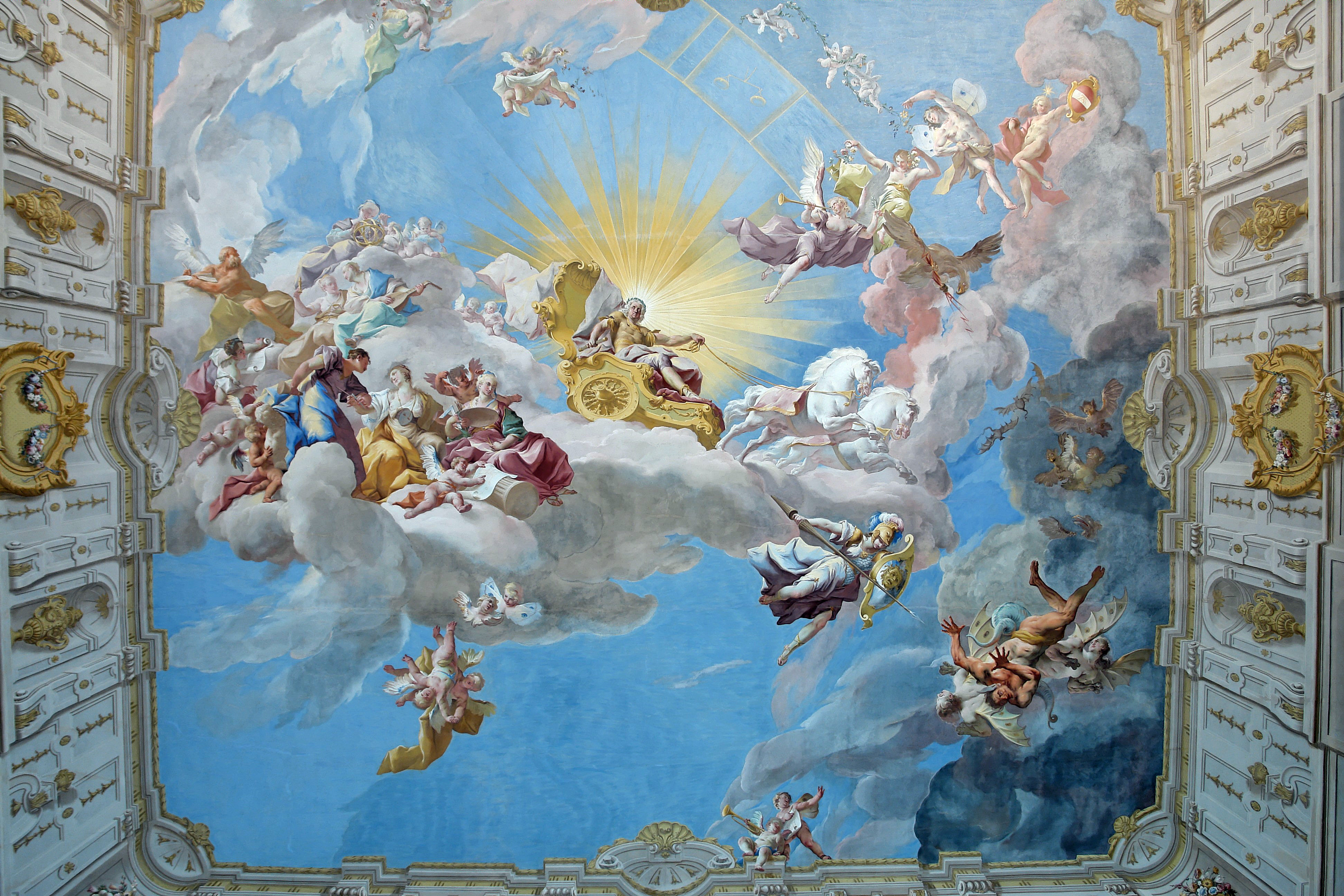
Paul Troger: Apotheosis of Charles VI, 1739

One of the main Germanic figures is Franz Anton Maulbertsch, active in a vast region of central and eastern Europe decorating numerous churches, considered one of the great masters of fresco of the eighteenth century. An original talent, brilliant technique and great colorist, he broke the academic canons and developed a strongly personal style that is difficult to categorize, sometimes compared to Tiepolo for the high quality of his work. Towards the end of the century a revulsion developed in Germany at the allegedly over-artificial French model, just as it did in some sectors of the art world in England – and even in France itself. German nationalists recommended the adoption of the sober, natural, and industrious manners of the English as an antidote to the French "theatrical affectations" and the "softness of false graces." Also to be included as important masters of the monumental Germanic Rococo are Johann Baptist Zimmermann, Antoine Pesne, Joseph Ignaz Appiani, Franz Anton Zeiller, Paul Troger, Franz Joseph Spiegler, Johann Georg Bergmüller, Carlo Carlone, among many others, who left a mark on so many churches and palaces.

=== Other examples ===
In the painting of other countries the impact of the Rococo was more limited, but some more or less isolated cases deserve note: in Spain, Goya in his first phase and Ramón Bayeu y Subías; in the United States, John Singleton Copley; in Russia, Dmitry Levitsky, Ivan Argunov and Fyodor Rokotov; in the Netherlands, Rachel Ruysch and Jan van Huysum; in Scandinavia, Carl Gustaf Pilo and Georg Desmarées; in Portugal Vieira Portuense and Pedro Alexandrino de Carvalho, and in Brazil the already mentioned Master Ataíde.

== Critical Fortune ==
The spirit of Rococo began to be attacked in the mid-18th century, after the rise of Enlightenment criticism and the puritanical ideals of the middle class. The main criticisms made since then and still made to the style were mainly directed at its French version or its more literal derivations. The French Rococo was an essentially aristocratic style, derived from a society that still carried a rigid social stratification and represented the final phase of the old feudal economic system. The Enlightenment questioned the foundations of this society and the model of civilization and culture it proposed, dissolving the hierarchies and modes of patronage that nourished rococo painting, already seen as frivolous, effeminate, elitist, and excessively ornamental, thinking the world from a more egalitarian viewpoint, regardless of traditions, myths, and religions, overturning cradle privileges and establishing new criteria for the acquisition of knowledge, where the clarity of reason and logical and scientific demonstration prevailed over the ambiguous and obscure subtleties of opinion, feeling, and the metaphysical.

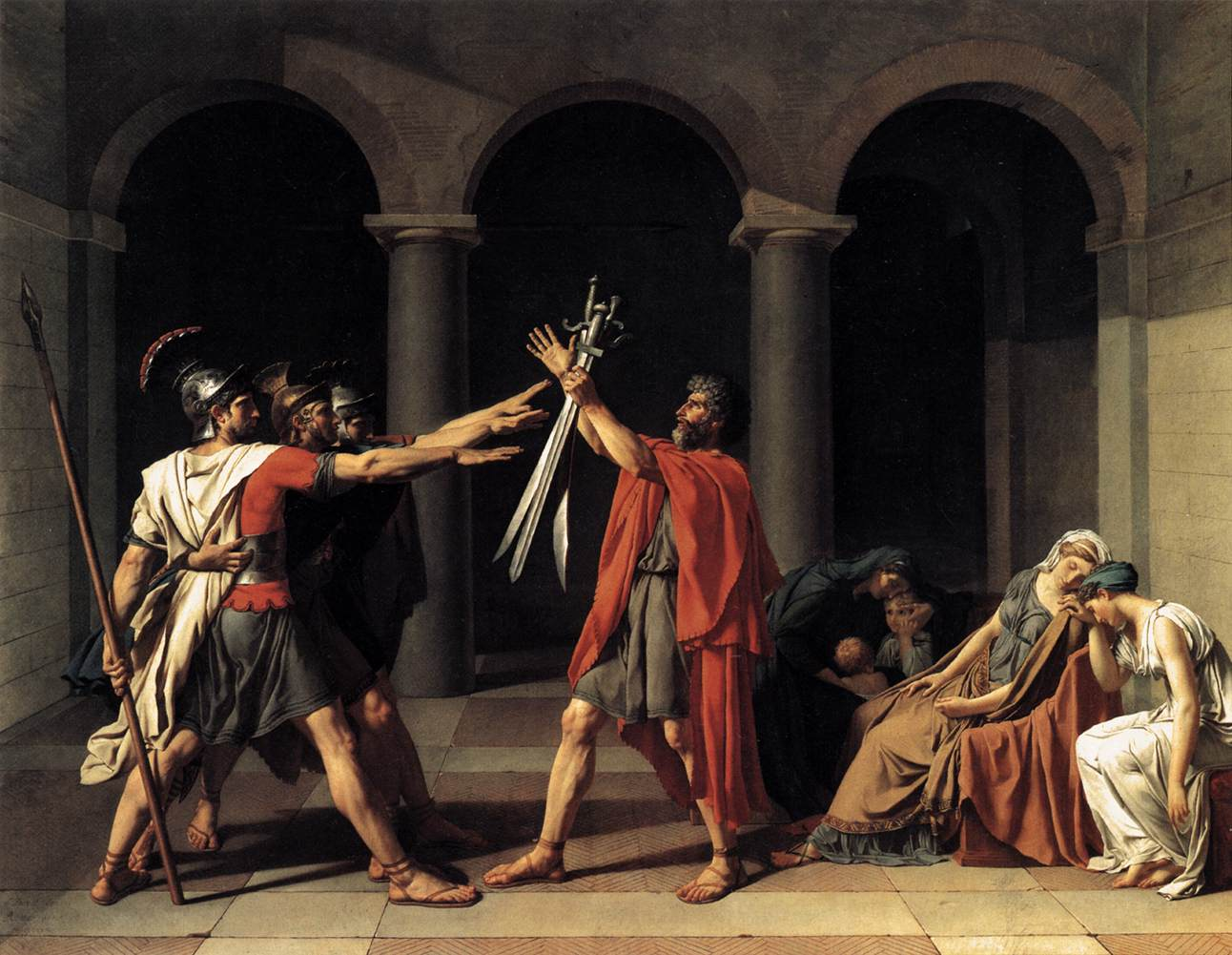
Jacques-Louis David: The Oath of the Horatii, 1784. Capital work of ethical, heroic and austere Neoclassicism

The middle class, in turn, easily identified the Rococo style as the face of the corrupt and dissolute elite it wished to overthrow, and the art it cultivated and appreciated, especially that of Chardin and Greuze, was diametrically opposed to it in both form and content. This process culminated in the French Revolution and the emergence of Neoclassicism, with a return of artistic ideals based on values of austerity, piety, civility, and ethics, in a reaffirmation of masculine principles and the rehabilitation of moralizing historical painting at the expense of the graceful, intimate, and sensual femininity of the Rococo.

But the eclipse of the style was brief. Once the most rigorous phase of Neoclassicism was over and European political stability had been restored to some degree after the Revolution and the final failure of Napoleon Bonaparte, in the 1830s rococo art returned to the scene through the literature of Gérard de Nerval, Théophile Gautier, and other authors, disillusioned with the excessive emphasis, as they saw it, on the conception that art should invariably be produced for a civic or didactic purpose, and with the world that for them had come to be dominated by an uneducated and tasteless bourgeoisie. The group began to develop a revivalist and nostalgic style, inspired by 18th century literature and painting, and to follow a way of life similar to that of the old aristocracy, with its salons and sophisticated habits, attracting the attention of other writers and poets. Soon their number would become considerable, giving rise to a romantic undercurrent in literature and visual arts, called Fanciful Romanticism, which would have great popular acceptance between the 1840s and 1850s.

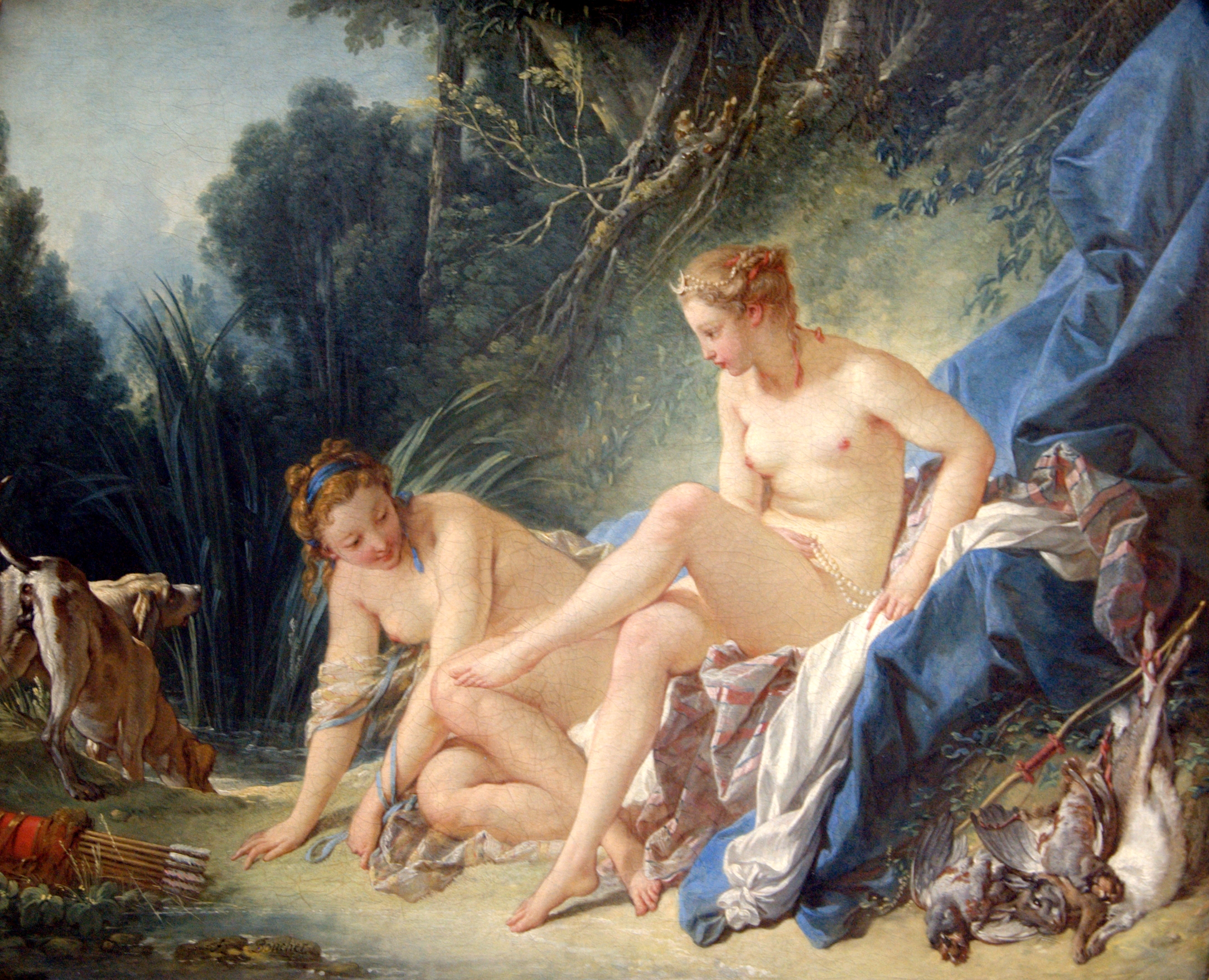
François Boucher: Diana leaving her Bath, 1742

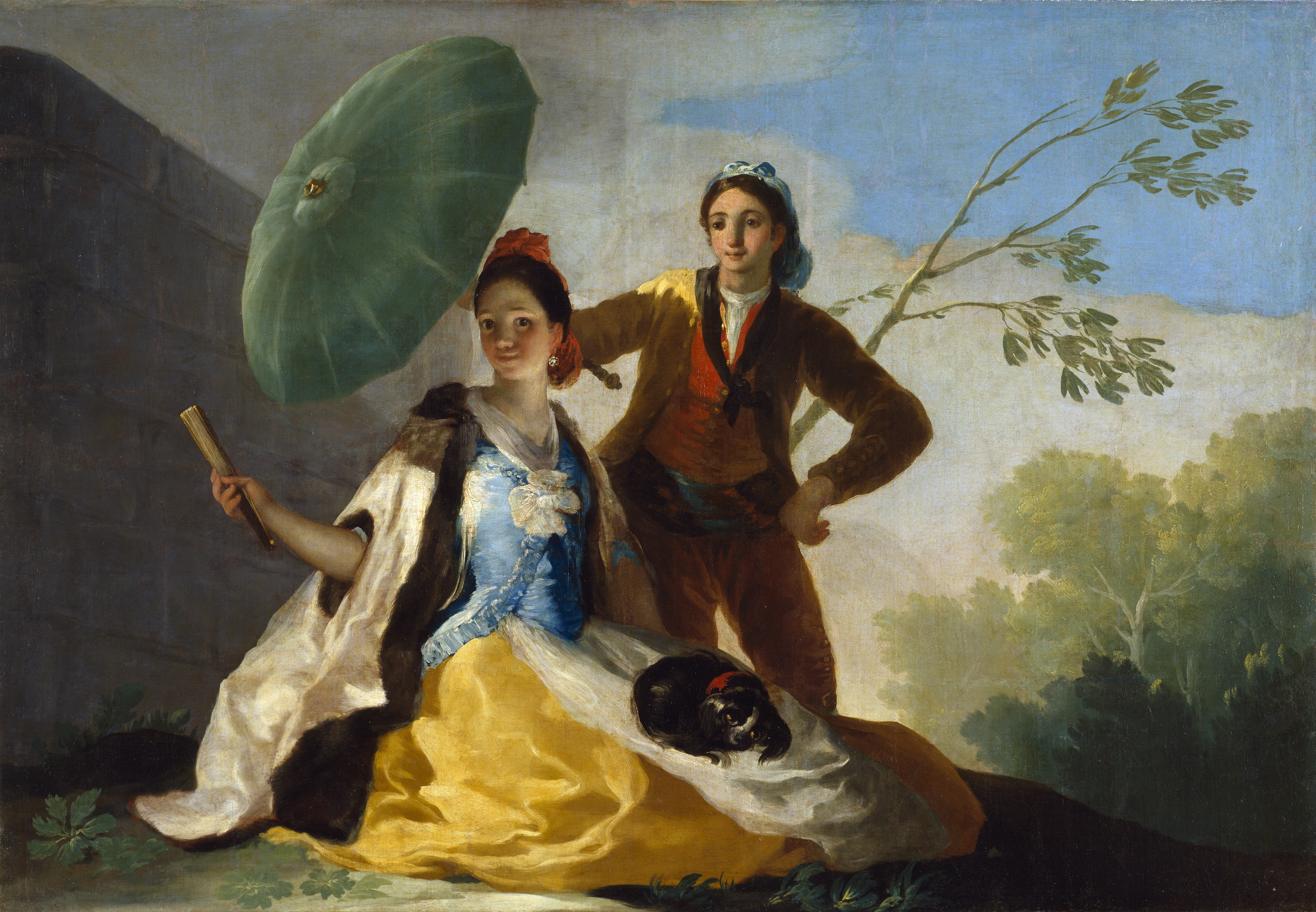
Francisco Goya: The Parasol, 1777

By the end of the 19th century, the French Rococo was fully recovered and established as a national cultural heritage of France, along with the rehabilitation of the decorative arts in general. During this phase, critical literature on the style multiplied, museums for the decorative arts were established, several eighteenth-century monuments were restored, and Rococo painting was once again understood as an integral part of a global conception of interior decoration, just as it was understood in its origin. This renewed enthusiasm for Rococo culminated with its consecration in the Louvre Museum in 1894, with the assignment of a wing entirely dedicated to 18th century art, where complete environments were recreated. It also stimulated a fashion for decorative objects and panels in revivalist style, and was one of the factors for the development of the applied arts and the high quality craftsmanship of Art Nouveau, besides having had a symbolic character of rapprochement between the elites inherited from the nobility and the bourgeoisie of the Third Republic. In the same period the importance of Tiepolo as one of the most distinguished muralists of the 18th century was rescued, and in the early 20th century Oswald Spengler gave a eulogy of Rococo art in his work The Decline of the West.

However, other authors such as Egon Friedell, writing between the wars, continued to consider the style in unflattering approaches. A new interest in the Rococo emerged in the 1940s when Fiske Kimball published his important study The Creation of the Rococo (1943), which attempted to delimit and describe the style on a curiously ahistorical critical basis, but which served to raise a series of new questions that brought to light inconsistencies in its definition, highlighted its complexity, and fueled subsequent scholarly debates, with major contributions by Arnold Hauser in the 1950s, in the 1950s, appreciating style in a deeper and more comprehensive way in the light of Marxism, and of Philippe Minguet and Russell Hitchcock in the 1960s, the latter focusing more on architectural sets, but Victor Tapiè and Myriam Oliveira believe that in the 1970s onwards there was even a regression in research to already outdated concepts, She particularly points to the approaches of Germain Bazin, Anthony Blunt, Yves Bottineau, and Georges Cattaui, who delimit it but submit it to the Baroque, referring to pre-Kimball visions.

What is clear is that there is still much controversy and contradictions in studies on Rococo, but nowadays critics more or less agree in seeing in the philosophy underlying Rococo painting elements of superficiality, elitism, pure hedonism, and alienation, but says that these aspects do not tell the whole story and that clinging to them from modern moral presuppositions may prevent the public from recognizing its value as art in its own right and as a vehicle for meanings important to the class that ruled Europe in the eighteenth century, a fact that is enough in itself to give it great historical and documentary interest. It is also widely admitted that in its best moments, Rococo painting reaches very high levels of technical excellence, and it is difficult for even the most hardened moralist to remain insensitive to its charm and its plastic richness, and to the skill of its authors. Another positive point of Rococo painting was detected in the reformulation and softening of Christian iconography, translating the elements of faith and portraying its martyrs and saints within a less heavy and oppressive formal frame than that produced during the Baroque, allowing the birth of a more jovial and optimistic devotion, less charged with guilt and reconciling nature with the divine. At the same time, his personalistic nature, his curiosity for novelties and exoticism, and his rejection of official academicism represented a movement toward creative freedom and spontaneity, so cherished today, and which were considered legitimate criteria for evaluating a work of art in those times. Alexander Pope thought so when he declared that "some beauties cannot yet be explained in precepts," and that "there are nameless graces which no method teaches, and which only the hand of a master can reach," qualities that could only be judged by "taste," a subtle element that in Voltaire's words is "a quick discernment, a sudden perception which, like the sensations of the palate, anticipates reflection, and accepts what gives a voluptuous and rare impression and rejects what seems coarse and disgusting.

In sum, for a better understanding of Rococo painting, it is necessary that we first clearly perceive that it is not limited to France, even though it appeared there most fully, typically and essentially, and is the basic reference of the entire style, but manifested itself in a great variety of forms in a vast area of the West, adapting itself to other demands and reflecting very diverse vital experiences and worldviews, and second, when we analyze its more difficult aspects, more paradoxical and more prone to criticism, that we try to penetrate the philosophy that guided that art of charms and fantasies, of visual and intellectual games and veiled allusions, that praised education and refinement against what it judged rude and uncouth, and expressed a voluptuousness and an authentic joy for the simple fact of living in a comfortable situation, which, if it was the prerogative of a few in its time, as we know, today has become the heritage of all through its artistic legacy.

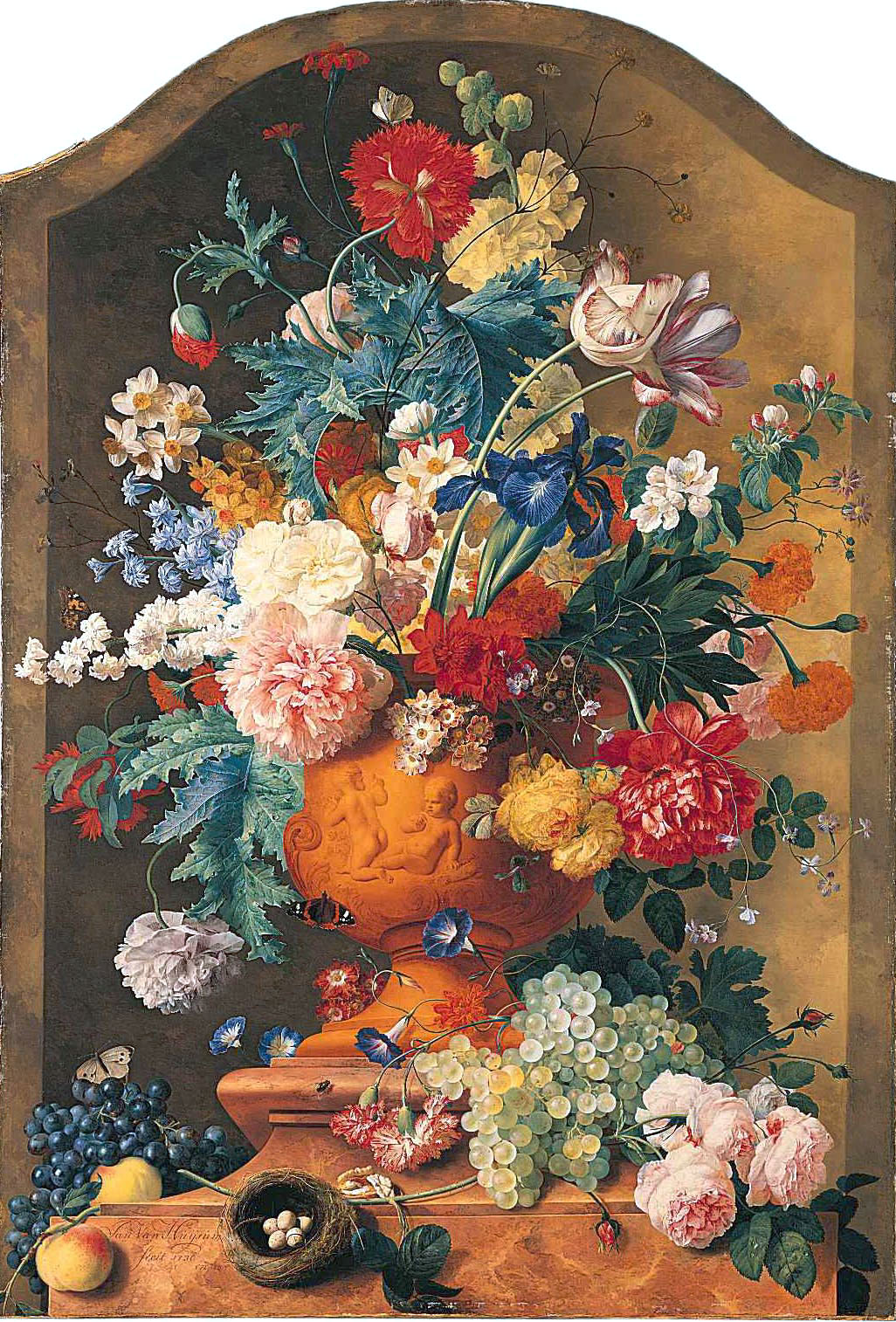
Jan van Huysum: Flowers, c. 1736

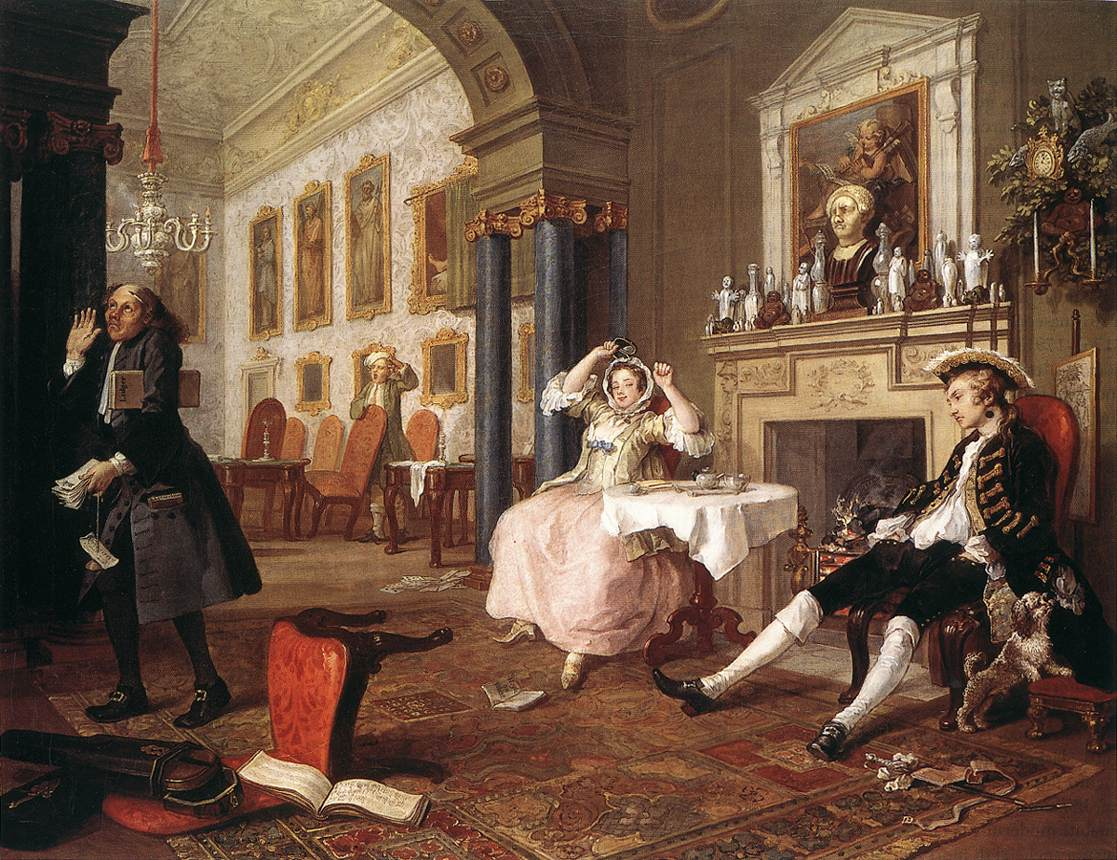
William Hogarth: Marriage à la Mode series - After the wedding, 1743

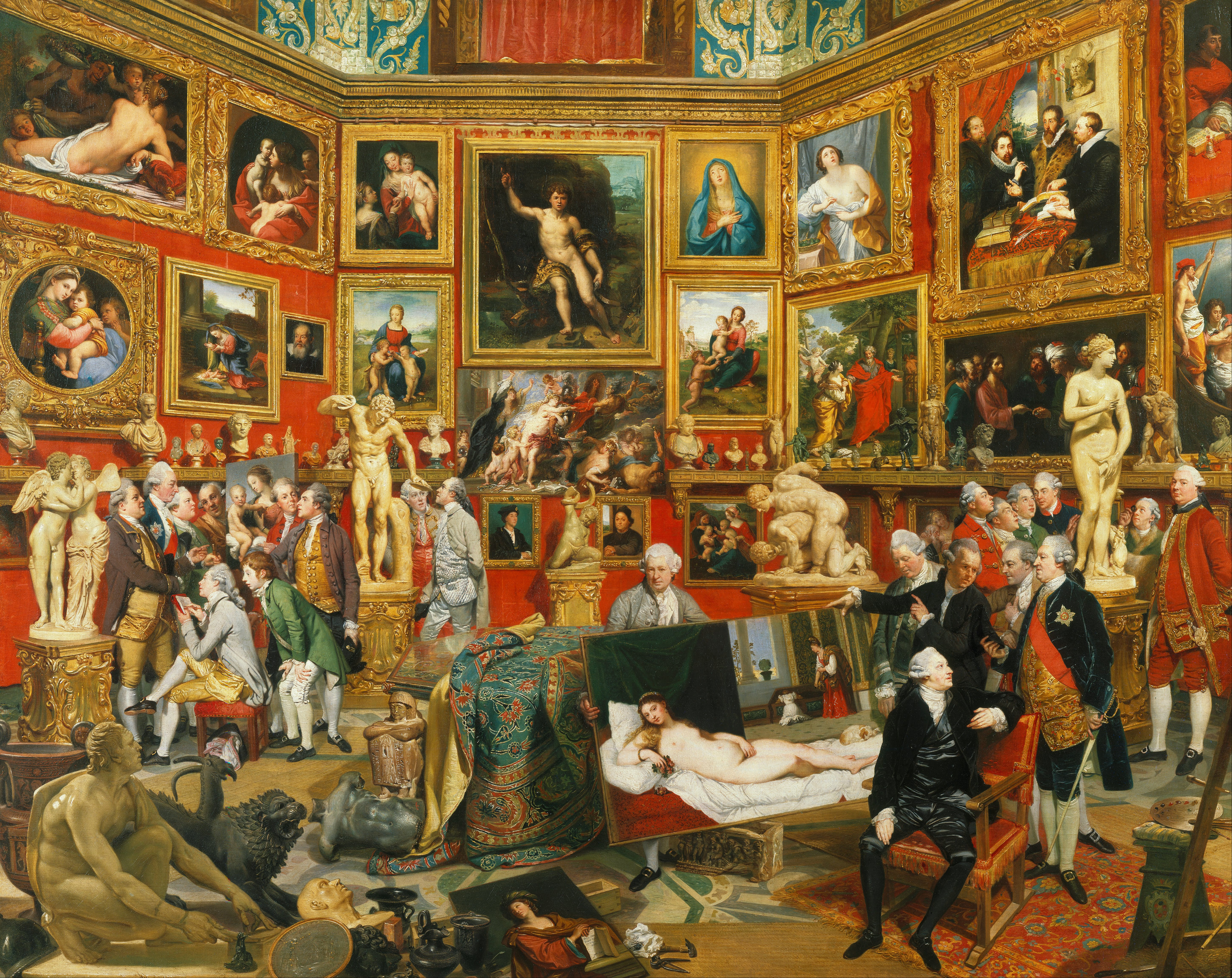
Johann Zoffany: The Tribuna of the Uffizi, 1772-78

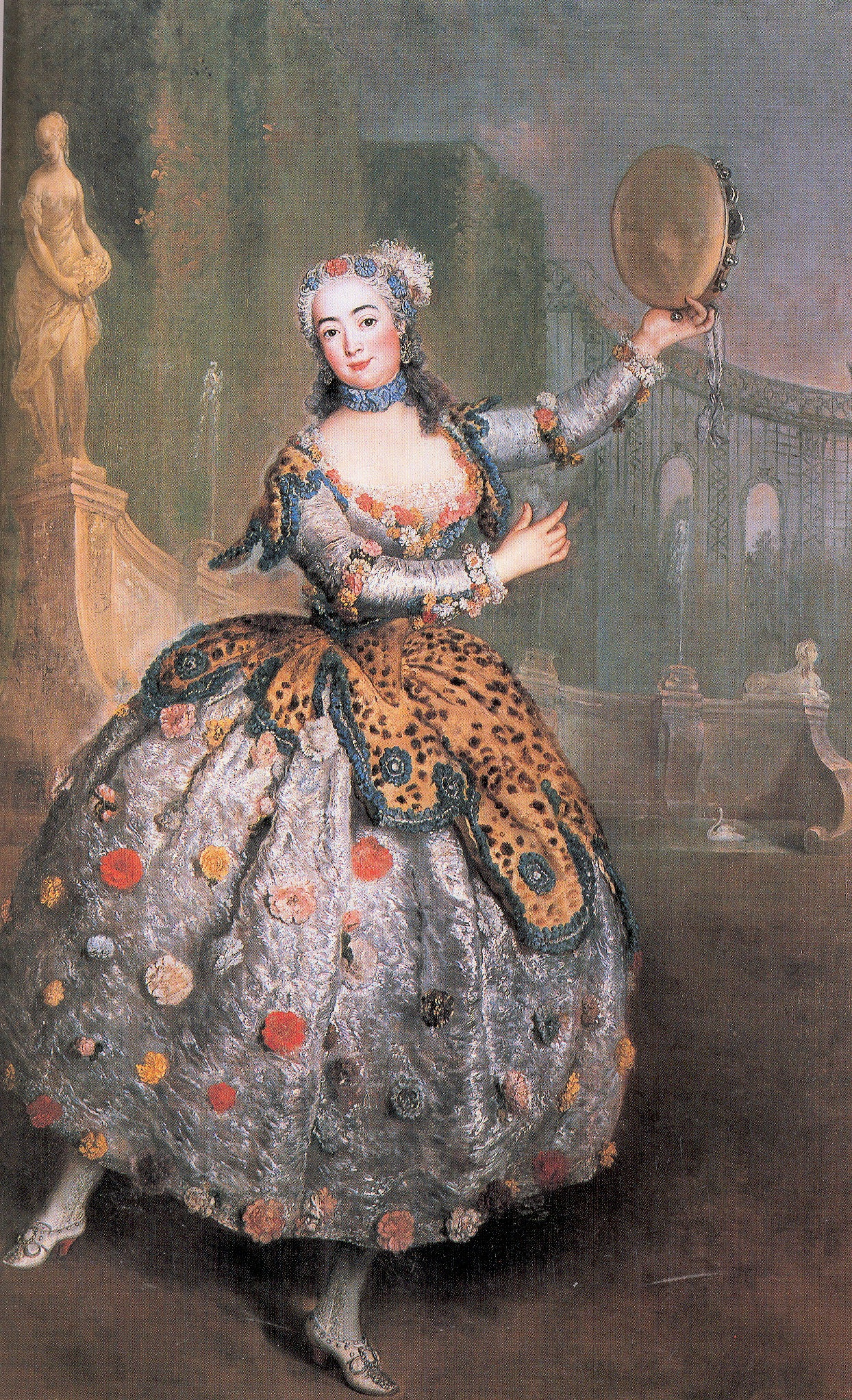
Antoine Pesne: Portrait of the dancer Barbara Campanini, c. 1745
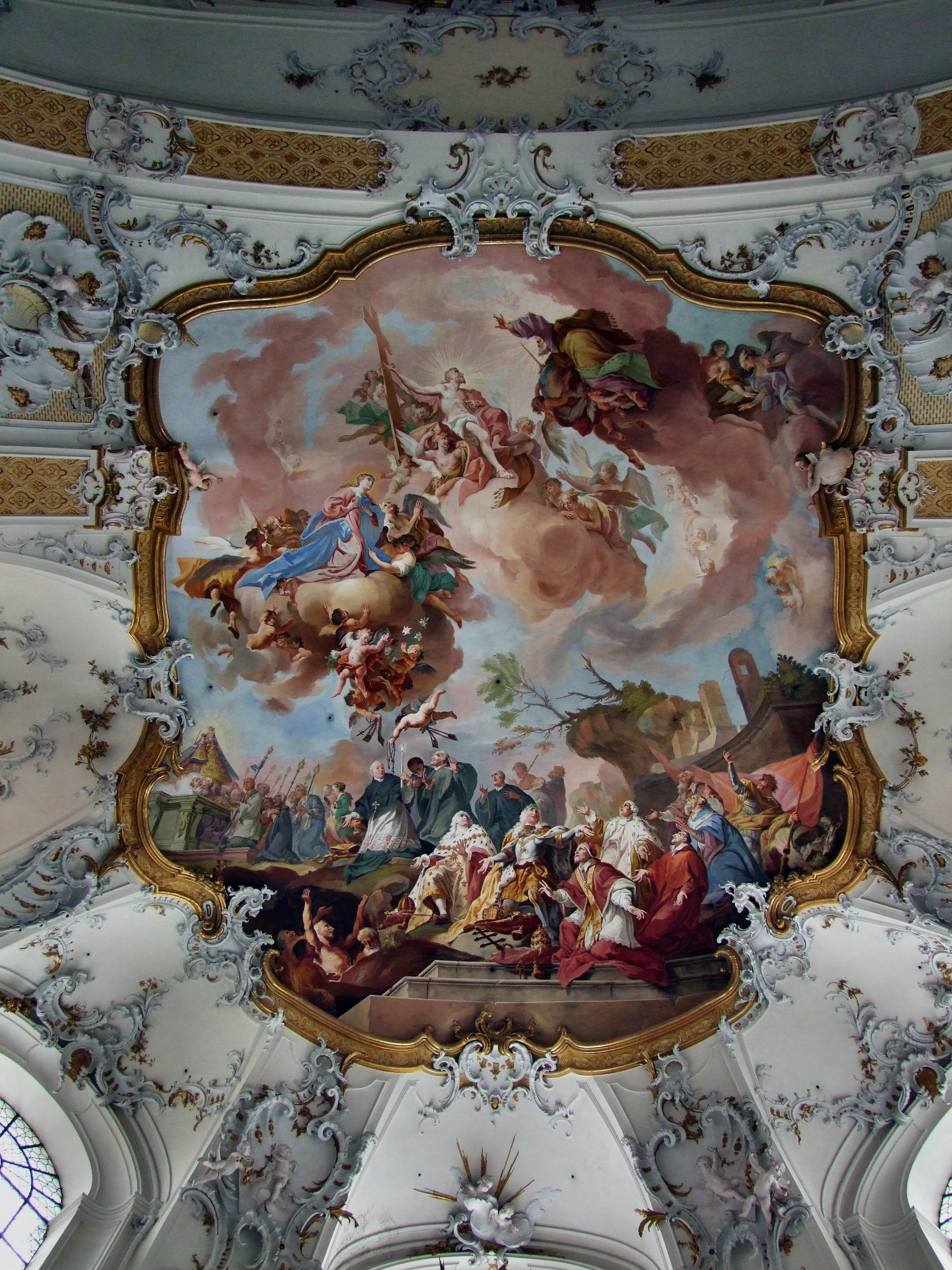
Franz Anton Zeiller: Fresco in the Basilica of Ottobeuren

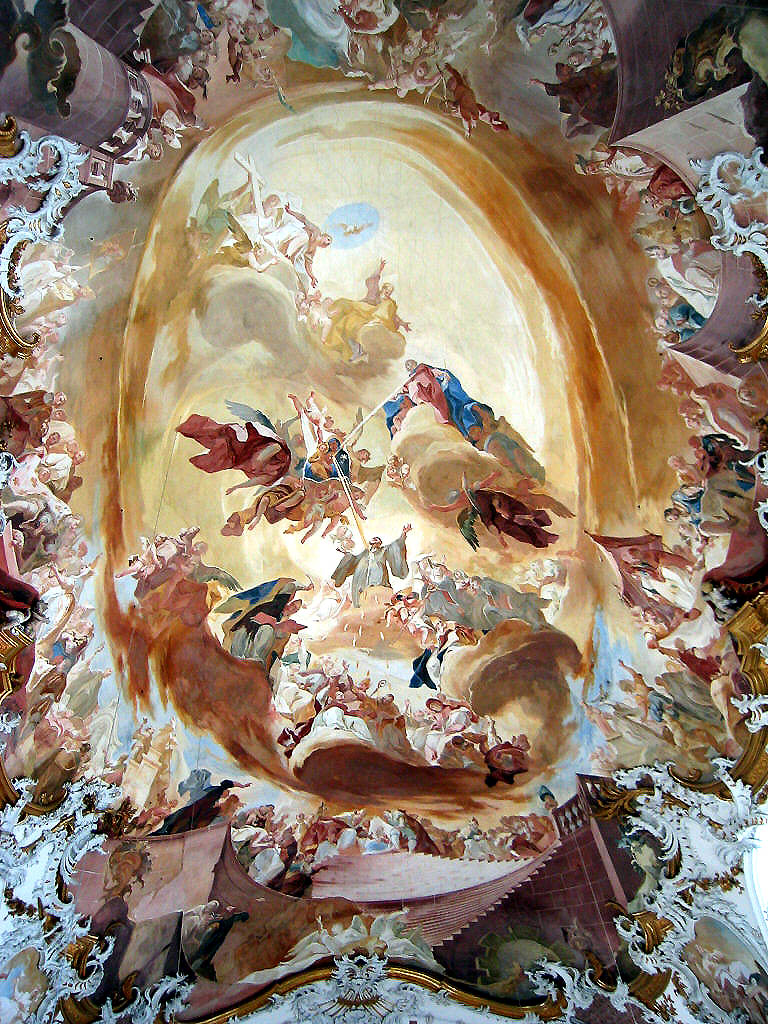
Franz Joseph Spiegler: Saint Mary, Saint Benedict of Norcia and various saints, 1751

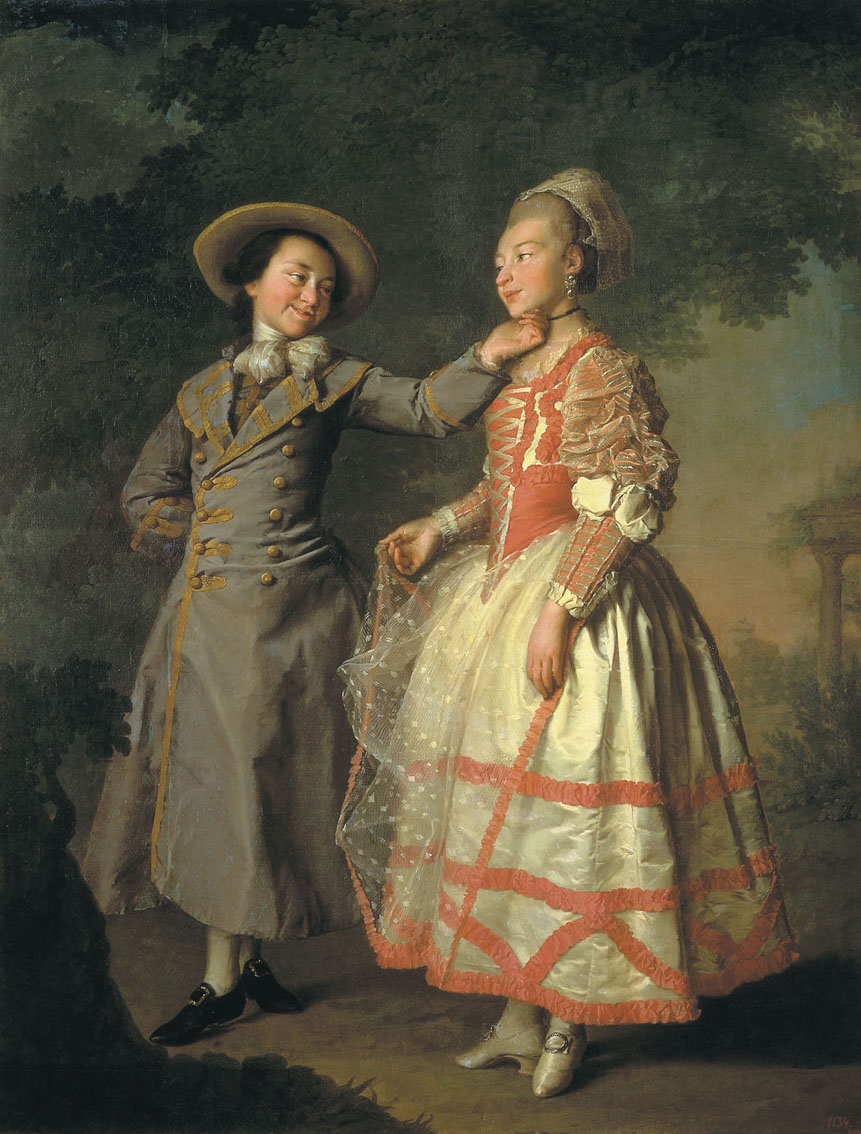
Dimitry Levitsky: Portrait of E. N. Khruschova and Princess E. N. Khovanskaya. 1773.

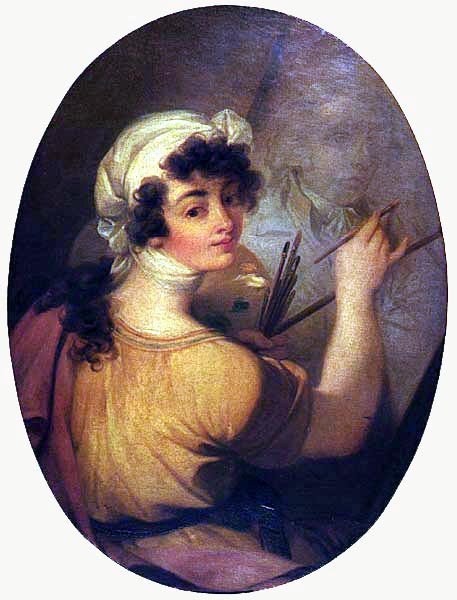
Vieira Portuense: Allegory of Painting, 1800

== See also ==
- Baroque painting
- History of painting
- Rococo architecture in Portugal
- Louis XV style
- Louis XVI style
