= Prix Marcel Proust =

The Marcel Proust Prize is a former literary award of France. Created by the municipal council of Cabourg, in Normandy, in 1972, it was awarded until 1994; the recipient was a work which evoked that of Marcel Proust. Writers were awarded 5,000 francs for their work.

== List of winners ==
- 1972: Michel Robida for Le Dragon de Chartres (Julliard)
- 1973: Georges Cattaui for Proust et ses métamorphoses (Nizet)
- 1974: Julien Green for Jeunesse (Plon)
- 1975: Emmanuel Berl for A venir et Regain au pays d'Auge (Le Livre de Poche)
- 1976: Marcel Schneider for Sur une étoile (Grasset)
- 1977: Jacques de Lacretelle for Les Vivants et leur ombre (Grasset)
- 1978: Roger Caillois for Le Fleuve Alphée (Gallimard)
- 1979: Henri Bonnet for Le Progrès spirituel dans la Recherche (Nizet)
- 1980: Jacques de Bourbon Busset for Les Choses simples (Gallimard)
- 1981: Angelo Rinaldi for La Dernière fête de l'Empire (Gallimard)
- 1982: Alain Bosquet for L'Enfant que tu étais (Grasset)
- 1983: Jean Delay for La Fauconnier, Avant-Mémoire (Gallimard)
- 1984: Robert de Saint-Jean for Passé pas mort (Grasset)
- 1985: Diane de Margerie for Le Ressouvenir (Flammarion)
- 1986: François-Olivier Rousseau for Sébastien Doré (Mercure de France)
- 1987-1988 : Claude Mauriac for Le Temps immobile (Grasset)
- 1993: René de Obaldia for Exobiographie
- 1994: Jean Chalon for Liane de Pougy, courtisane princesse et sainte (Flammarion) ISBN 9782080668479
