= Éric Jourdan =

French novelist and playwright

Éric Jourdan (born Jean Roger Éric Gaytérou; 29 May 1930 – 7 February 2015) was a French novelist and playwright.

== Biography ==
Jourdan was born in Paris on 29 May 1930. His first novel, Les Mauvais Anges (English: Two or Wicked Angels), was published in 1955. An English translation by Richard Howard that followed in 1963, has been described as "more of an adaptation than a translation". In France the Commission de Censure banned its distribution until 1984. The novel consists of two narratives authored by each of its seventeen-year-old principal characters, a pair of male cousins raised as brothers. Their summer idyll begins in innocence and becomes an "obsessive and increasingly violent passion", and ends in death, with the boys exchanging roles throughout.

A few of his later novels explore the theme of violence, others the self-realization of same-sex attraction, or family conflict, and historical frameworks.

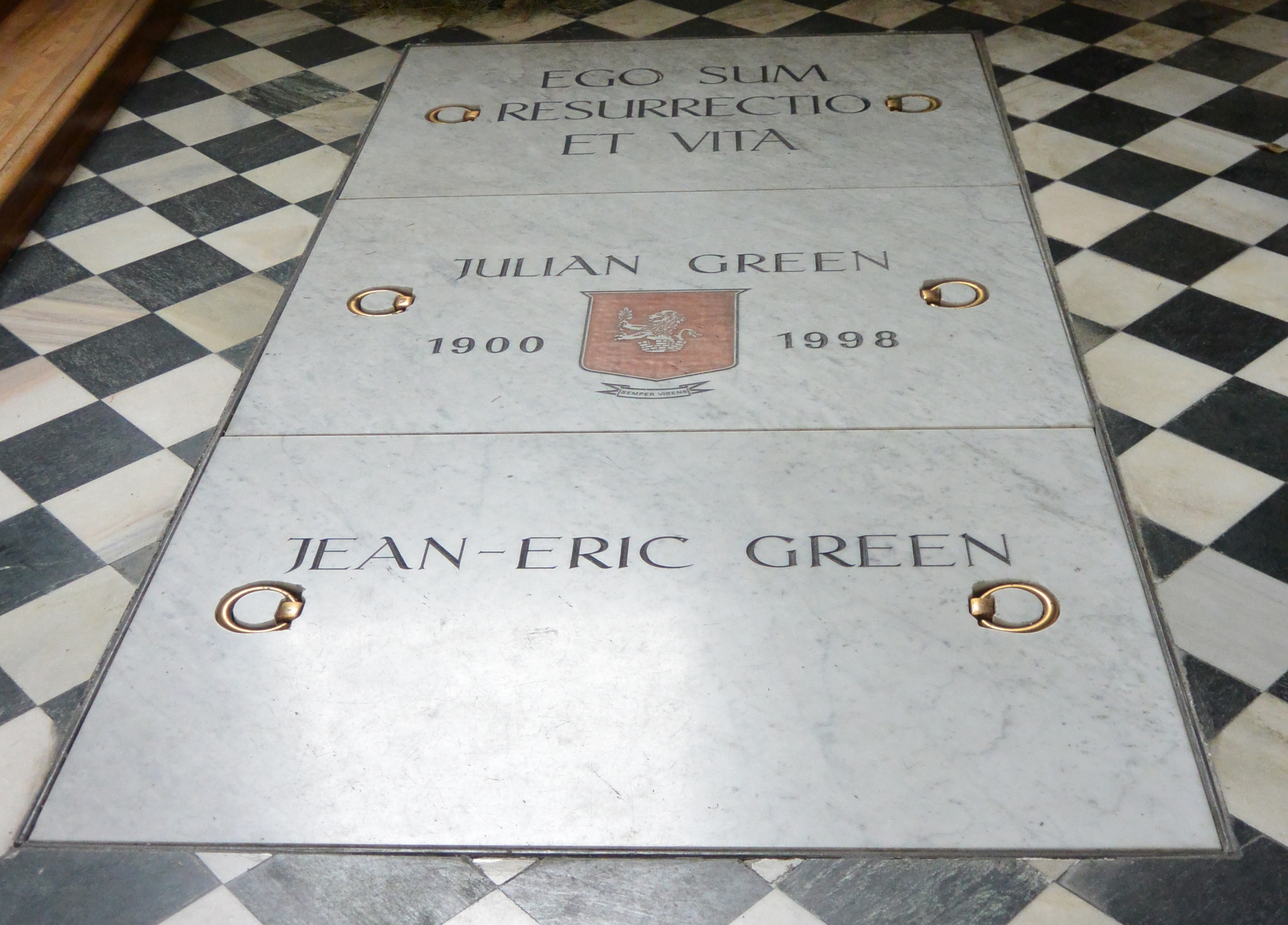

Jourdan continued to write using pseudonyms. He moved often and lived a bohemian lifestyle, living in Savoie and Tyrol, Austria.

After he was adopted sometime after 1990 as an adult by the eminent French-American writer Julien Green (1900–1998), he lived primarily in Paris. He served Green as secretary and companion, managing relationships with publishers and organizing his social life. He collaborated with Green on a variety of publishing projects, sometimes using a pseudonym, translating Green's work or editing correspondence.

After Green's death in 1998, Jourdan served as the executor of Green's estate. Controversy surrounded his attempts to control Green's publications and protect his reputation. His auction of Green's manuscripts in 2011 failed to attract the price he demanded. He donated them in lieu of inheritance taxes to the Bibliothèque nationale de France. Assessing Jourdan's performance as executor Frédéric Martel writing in France Culture called him "a mediocre, if not insignificant, novelist with a mischievous and money-grubbing character".

After his adoption he took his father's surname. His tombstone presents him as Jean-Éric Green.

== Selected works ==
Author

- Mauvais anges, 1955, reissued 1991; published in English as Two (1963), later as Wicked Angels
- Charité, 1985
- Révolte, 1986
- Sang, 1995
- L'Amour brut, Flammarion, 2004
- Pour jamais
- Saccage
- Le Garçon de joie
- Le Songe d’Alcibiade
- Lieutenant Darnancourt 2010
- Portrait d'un jeune seigneur en dieu des moissons, et autres nouvelles
- Trois coeurs
- Aux gémonies

Editor

- The Story of Two Souls: the Correspondence of Jacques Maritain and Julien Green, edited by Henry Bars, Eric Jourdan, Bernard Doering, Fordham University Press, 1988
- Julien Green–Jacques Maritain: Une grande amitié, Correspondance 1926–1972, text and notes by Henry Bars and Éric Jourdan, Gallimard
