= Robert de Saint-Jean =

French writer and journalist

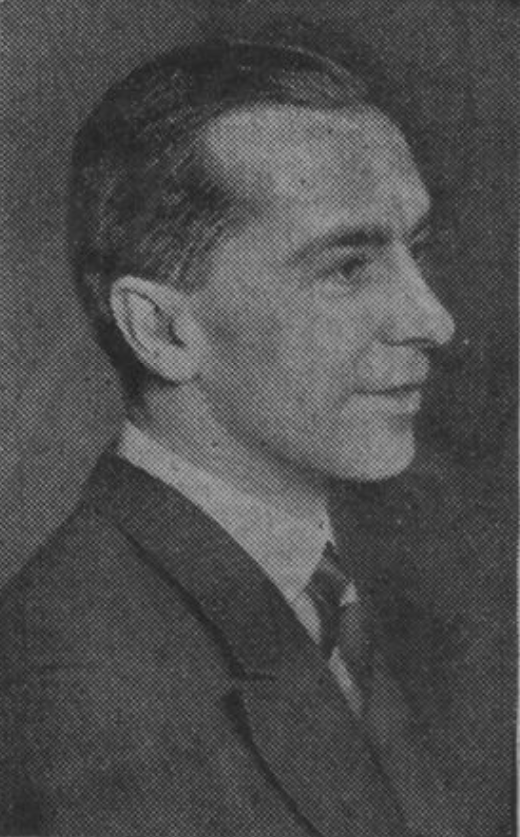

Robert de Saint Jean (1901–1987) was a French writer and journalist. He was the companion of the French-speaking American writer Julien Green. Like Green, he kept a diary which he eventually published. It provides insight into French society and cultural life over several decades.

He worked, in particular, for Paris-Soir, le Parisien libéré, and Paris Match.

When France fell to the Nazis in 1940, he was deputy chief of staff to the French minister of information. His writing had made him a personal enemy of German foreign minister Joachim von Ribbentrop. Green arranged for him to gain entry to Portugal and then transfer to the US.

In 1984 he received the Prix Marcel Proust. He also worked as editor for the Plon publishing house.

== Selected works ==
- 1934: La vraie révolution de Roosevelt, Éditions Grasset
- 1941: Démocratie, beurre et canons, Maison de la France, New York; online transcription
- 1936: Le Feu sacré, Éditions Gallimard
- 1967: Julien Green par lui-même, Éditions du Seuil
- 1974: Journal d'un journaliste
- 1975: Moins cinq
- 1983: Passé pas mort, Grasset
- 1990: Julien Green, with Luc Estang
