= Georges Cattaui =

- Born: 14 September 1896; 8th arrondissement of Paris
- Died: 1974 (aged 77–78); Gland
- Occupation: Writer

Georges Cattaui (14 September 1896 – 1974) was a French writer of Egyptian-Jewish origin. First cousin of Jean de Menasce, he belonged to the Jewish aristocracy of Alexandria, where he spent his first years.

== Biography ==
Born in Paris on 14 September 1896, Felix Georges Cattaui (son of Adolphe Cattaui and Rachel Francis), studied at the Lycée Carnot, and then studied law which opened his diplomatic career. He founded L'Atelier (the workshop) in Cairo and organized the third anniversary of the birth of Molière, then the popular university, a privileged place for French culture in Egypt. A secretary of King Fouad I he wrote the official speeches. He was secretary of the Legations in Prague, Bucharest and London. Between the two world wars, he took courses in theology at the University of Fribourg.

From 1936, he abandoned diplomacy and devoted himself to writing. After 1945, he wrote numerous columns in Le Journal de Genève. Naturalized French he died in 1974 in Gland, Switzerland. From Jewish confession he had converted to Catholicism in April 1928.

In August 1944, he met, in Switzerland, Emmanuelle de Dampierre, wife of Infante Jaime of Spain, Duke of Anjou and Segovia. He persuaded her that her husband was the legitimate pretender to the French throne.

While pursuing a career as a diplomat, he published several essays and biographies, particularly on Marcel Proust

- In 1969 the Académie française bestowed him the Prix du rayonnement français.
- In 1973 he obtained the prix Marcel Proust for his work Proust et ses métamorphoses.
- His work Proust, documents iconographiques, published in 1956, remains the study of reference regarding the iconography of Marcel Proust.

== Publications ==
- 1925: Aux jeunes hommes d'Israël, La Revue juive, n° 5, September 1925
- 1945: La Terre visitée, Égloff
- 1953: Marcel Proust, Proust et son Temps, Proust et le Temps, preface by Daniel-Rops, Éditions Julliard
- 1956: Proust, documents iconographiques, éditions Pierre Cailler, series "Visages d'hommes célèbres", 248 pages illustrated with 175 photos relating to Marcel Proust.
- 1958: T. S. Eliot, Éditions universitaires
- 1960: Jules Hardouin-Mansart
- 1960: Charles de Gaulle, l'homme et son destin, Fayard
- 1963: Proust perdu et retrouvé, Plon
- 1964: Constantine P. Cavafy
- 1964: Charles Péguy, témoin du temporel chrétien, Éditions du Centurion
- 1964: Léon Bloy, Éditions universitaires
- 1965: Orphisme et prophétie chez les poètes français 1850–1950, Plon
- 1971: Proust, Éditions universitaires, Le Livre de Poche
- 1973: L'Art baroque et rococo,
- 1973: Proust et ses métamorphoses, Nizet
- 1968: Actes du colloque de Cerisy devoted to Paul Claudel, under the direction of Georges Cattaui and Jacques Madaule
