= Julien Green =

American novelist who lived in France

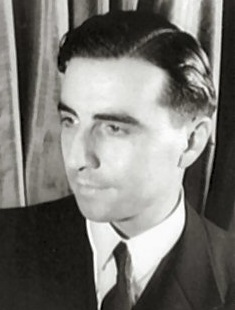
- Green in 1933, photograph by Carl van Vechten
- Born: Julian Hartridge Green; 6 September 1900; Paris, France
- Died: 13 August 1998 (aged 97); Paris, France
- Resting place: Sankt Egid Church, Klagenfurt, Austria
- Occupations: Novelist, diarist and essayist
- Partner: Robert de Saint-Jean
- Children: Éric Jourdan (adopted)
- Writing career
- Pen name: Théophile Delaporte; David Irland
- Notable works: The Dark Journey; The Closed Garden; Moira; Each Man in His Darkness; Dixie trilogy; Diary (1919–1998); Autobiography (four volumes)

Julien Green (originally "Julian Hartridge Green", 6 September 1900 – 13 August 1998), often Julian Green, was an American writer who lived most of his life in France and wrote primarily in French, although he also wrote some works in English. Over a long and prolific career, he authored novels and essays, several plays, and a biography of Francis of Assisi, produced a four-volume autobiography, and for decades maintained a daily journal that he edited and published in nineteen volumes. The posthumous publication of the unexpurgated journals revealed aspects of his personality and sexuality that had been omitted from the published editions, revealed details about many of his prominent contemporaries, and documented the gay subculture of 20th-century France.

When elected to membership in the Académie française in 1971, he was the first non-French national to join its ranks. He was the recipient of many awards and one of the few writers to have his collected works published in Gallimard's Pleiade library during his lifetime.

== Early years ==
Julian Hartridge Green was born to American parents in Paris on 6 September 1900. He was the namesake of an ancestor on his mother's side, Julian Hartridge (1829–1879), who served as member of the House of Representatives of the Confederate States of America and then as a Democratic Representative from Georgia to the US Congress for four years; Julien's parents settled in Paris in 1893. (Note: The Académie française gives the date as 1893. The New York Times says 1895. Another account has the family moving to Le Havre in 1893 and then to Paris in 1897.) His mother Mary Adelaide née Hartridge was from Savannah, his father Edward from Virginia. Toward the end of his life Green told an interviewer that when his father's employer, Southern Cotton Oil Company, allowed him to work in Germany or France, Julien's mother urged they settle in France on the grounds that the French, having recently suffered defeat in the Franco-Prussian War, would prove sympathetic to Americans who identified with the defeated US Confederacy.

Julien was the youngest of seven children born to Protestant parents. He was educated in French schools, including the Lycée Janson-de-Sailly. (Note: Sources differ as to the number of siblings. One account spécifiés there were eight children, one of whom died shortly after being born.) In his early years his mother was the center of his emotional life and he was raised in her traditional Protestant home. She died in 1914, and Green became a Roman Catholic in 1916.

In 1917, still only 16, he volunteered as an ambulance driver in the American Field Service. When his age was discovered his enlistment was annulled. He immediately signed up for a six-month term of service with an ambulance unit of the American Red Cross. In 1918 he enlisted in the French Army and served as a second lieutenant in an artillery unit until 1919. After the war, he spent three years from 1919 to 1922 studying at the University of Virginia at the invitation of his mother's brother Walter Hartridge. While there he wrote his first fiction, a short story in English.

=== First works ===
He returned to France in 1922. After briefly exploring a career as a painter, he turned to writing in French and had a few short reviews and sketches published in periodicals. His first published work in French was the Pamphlet contre les catholiques de France, which appeared under the pseudonym Théophile Delaporte. (Note: The Pamphlet was published in English translation in 1940.) It criticized his fellow French Catholics for their complacency in failing to promote their faith energetically. He launched his career as a novelist with Mont-Cinère in 1926. It impressed Jacques Maritain with its "grandeur", marked by "that uninterrupted contact with the soul" found in great writers. Green had already committed his second novel to another publisher, but Maritain was "enthusiastic" to publish his third, Adrienne Mesurat, a few months later, seeing in it "an interior power, a rectitude, and a profundity that are admirable". Their relationship gave Green a powerful critic and supporter, a correspondent and friend until Maritain's death in 1973. About this time his French publishers identified him as "Julien", using the French spelling of his first name. His US publishers and the New York Times used "Julian", and he was immediately recognized in the US as an important new voice. In 1928 Louis Kronenberger wrote: "After six months Julian Green's Avarice House [Mont-Cinère] still remains vivid in the memory of this reviewer.... One feel safe in saying Julian Green is an important novelist."

His attachment to Catholicism weakened during the 1920s, though he asserted it again after a "mystical experience" in 1934.

He visited the US again in the early 1930s, beginning and abandoning work on a novel set in the 19th-century American South.

In 1938 he began publishing his journals, which he edited extensively to suppress accounts of his and others' sexual adventures and opinions he had expressed more freely in private than in public. He had described the problem in his journal in 1931: "This journal is truly the bottle [thrown] in the sea. Its nature makes it almost unpublishable in my lifetime." Two volumes appeared before the Nazi invasion of France forced him into exile.

=== War years ===
In July 1940, after France's surrender, he fled Paris for Pau in southwest France near the Spanish border. He obtained visas for himself and his partner Robert de Saint-Jean for Portugal and they sailed together on the Excambion and reached New York on 15 July. He stayed at first with a cousin in Baltimore. In 1942, he was mobilized and sent to New York City to work at the United States Office of War Information. For almost a year, five times a week, he broadcast to France as part of the radio broadcasts of Voice of America, working with such notables as André Breton. Green returned to France in late September 1945. He found that a friend had safely stored his papers and apartment furnishings, including family heirlooms.

While in the US he wrote his first work of any length in English. His memoir of childhood Memories of Happy Days was called "one of the most innately beautiful and subtly communicative books to be written by any American about France". He gave talks at Mills College and Goucher College, and he contributed articles to Harper's Magazine, Commonweal, and The Atlantic Monthly. He also translated two works by Charles Péguy into English: The Mystery of the Charity of Joan of Arc and Basic Verities, Men and Saints.

=== Later career ===
In 1947 he worked on a screenplay for a film about Saint Ignatius of Loyola, intended for director Robert Bresson, but he failed to complete it.

His 1960 novel Chaque homme dans sa nuit, set largely in New York, appeared that same year in a translation by Green's sister Anne Green. Henri Peyre wrote of it with enthusiasm: "Strange and tense, it is nevertheless compelling, as Dostoevsky's fiction is", though he noted Green achieved this "in spite of an uncertain design and its disregard for all ordinary realism".

Between 1963 and 1974 he published four volumes of memoirs covering the first two decades of his life, the years before he began to keep the daily journals that he had been publishing since 1938. In the third volume, Terre lointaine (1966), he described how he became aware of his homosexuality while at the University of Virginia, experienced his first crush, and gained second-hand experience from a similarly inclined fellow student. In the fourth volume, Jeunesse (1974), he depicted himself in college: "No one was ever so petrified by a Medusa's head as I was by what struck me as a perfect young [man's] face." He portrayed himself throughout his life as a chaste homosexual whose relationship with his lifelong companion was "platonic". Numerous Catholic prelates expressed their admiration for this "model of righteousness".

Green was elected to succeed to François Mauriac's chair in the Académie française on 3 June 1971, the first member not a French citizen. (Note: "Could Mr. Green be made into a Frenchman? ... Maurice Genevoix, [the Académie] chief secretary, spoke to President Pompidou, who asked Rene Pleven, the Minister of Justice who approved. On the strength of his birth in France, long residence here and eminence of services rendered the country, the writer will hence forth “be considered” a French man.) He was received and delivered his inaugural lecture on 16 November 1972. In 1996, he caused a minor scandal by resigning from the Académie, disavowing any interest in honors and describing himself as "American, exclusively" (americain, exclusivement). The Académie responded that membership was "not an unstable position, but an irrevocable dignity". His resignation was not accepted and he was not replaced until after his death. (Note: According to the Académie, Green's seat became vacant upon his death.)

In 1975, the Pleiade library began republishing several volumes of Green's work, an honor rarely accorded a living writer.

In 1976, a collection of "articles and lecture notes" written by Green in the U.S. during World War II was published–only in English–as Memories of Evil Days. It was partly a memoir, but included reflections on "the links between language-usage and the creative process".

In March 1983, his first work for the stage, Sud, premiered to mixed reviews, though the public supported it, as did some writers. Set during the American Civil War, a young officer's life is transformed when he encounters a handsome teenage boy. In 1984, Green's personal contribution to the travel genre was published as Paris. An American bi-lingual French/English edition followed in 1991. Its 19 short chapters offered remembrances; it was less a travel guide than "a reflection and an exercise in introspection".

Between 1987 and 1993 he published a trilogy of novels set in the 19th-century American South, a project he had long postponed. His longevity and work in different genres complicated his image in the US. By the time his autobiography began to appear in English in 1993, an American reviewer could write: "Julian Green may be the one most difficult for American readers to place. He's English, isn't he? At least, his books often turn up in the mustier corners of British secondhand bookstores. Or perhaps he's French. That's the rumor anyway. Much acclaimed in Paris, and probably long dead. But wait, here's a novel published only last year and set in the antebellum South?"

In 1993 Green published–again only in English–a collection of short pieces: The Apprentice Writer: Essays. All were originally written in English between 1920 and 1946, the oldest being the short story "The Apprentice Psychiatrist". His subjects included the Paris literary scene before World War II and the relationship between language and personality. Of growing up bi-lingual Green wrote: "as a child I could not bring myself to believe that English was a real language".

Among the many honors he received were the Harper Prize for Memories of happy days (1942); election to the Bavarian Academy (1950) and the academies of Mainz, Mannheim and the Royal Academy of Belgium; the Prince Pierre of Monaco Literary Prize for the entirety of his work (1951); the national grand prize for letters (1966); the Grand Prix for Literature from the French Academy (1970); election to the United States Academy of Arts and Letters (1972); the German Universities Prize (1973); the Polish Grand Prize for Literature (1988); the Cavour Prize, Grand Prize for Literature (1991); and the Theater Prize of the Universities of Bologna and Forli.

=== Death and legacy ===
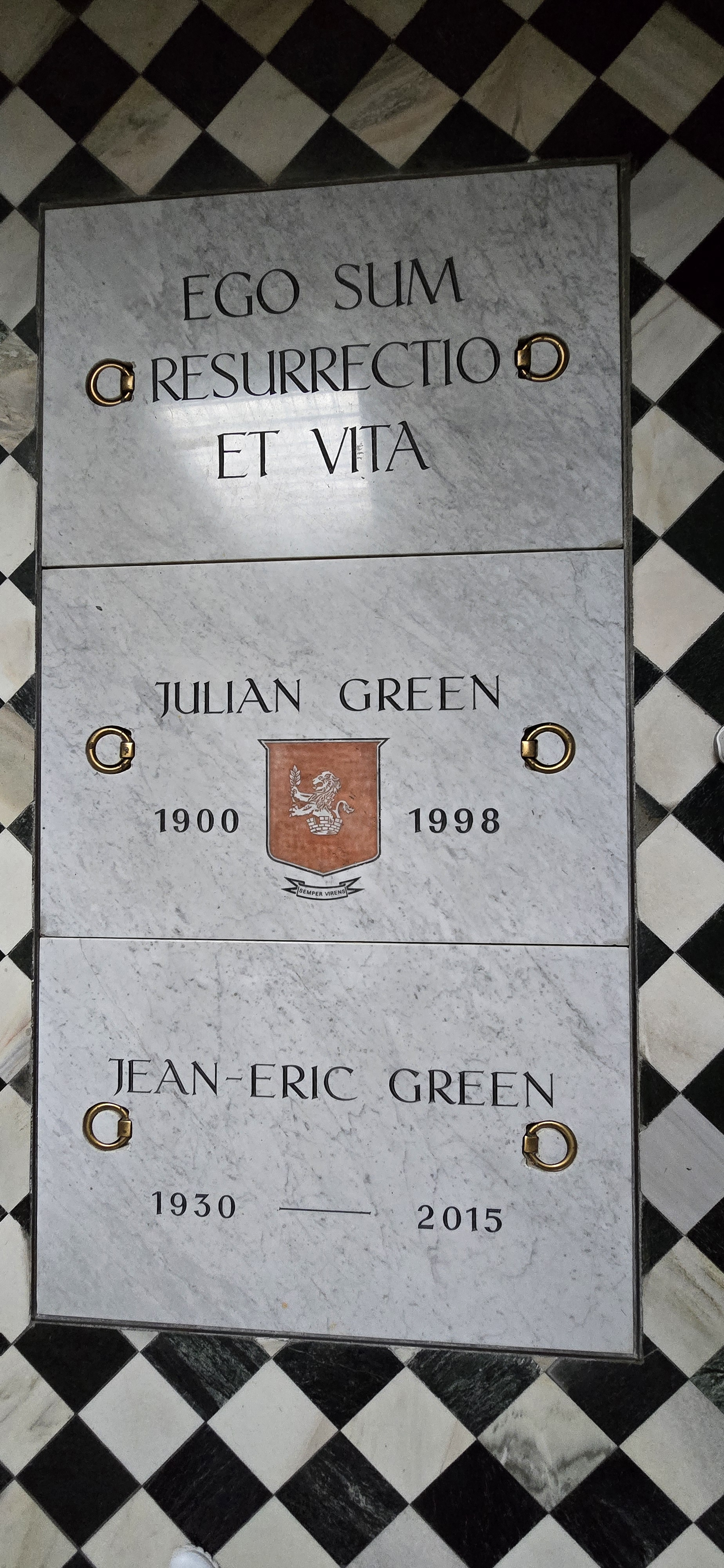
The grave of Julien Green and Jean-Éric Green at St Egid’s Church in Klagenfurt.

Green died in Paris on 13 August 1998, shortly before his 98th birthday. His remains were entombed in a chapel designed for him in St. Egid Church, Klagenfurt, Austria. The chapel decoration includes a painting Green commissioned, Die Emmausjünger (The Disciples at Emmaus). His tombstone names him "Julian", using the original English spelling rather than the French "Julien" by which he was known.

After Green's death, his adopted son Éric Jourdan (1938–2015) served as executor of his estate. From him the Green-Meldrim House in Savannah, the home of Green's paternal grandfather, bought a collection of furniture, ceramics, silver, family photographs, and a ledger.

Jourdan also tried to restrict the publication of some of Green's work, protecting his reputation with a new "prudishness" even more than Green had in censoring his own journals for publication. After Éric Jourdan's death in 2015, Jourdan's executor Tristan Gervais de Lafond, a jurist of some distinction, supported the publication of the unexpurgated text of Green's journals and the first volume appeared in September 2019. The publishing program respected Green's restriction that sensitive material not appear until fifty years had passed. Included were "hundreds of pages, with countless pornographic and vulgar passages crossed out", with as much as half the material published for the first time, sexual matters as well as assessments of colleagues and literary figures, as well as racist and anti-semitic statements. It transformed Green's public image: his homosexuality was never a secret but Green had always indicated it was "under control" or channeled into platonic relationships. The full text records such a variety of sexual encounters that it documents gay life in the years between the world wars.

One reviewer wrote: "We knew he was homosexual; we didn't know to what extent." Another noted that Green's crude descriptions shocked less than the quality of the sex: not satisfying but "angry" and "haughty". In the Catholic Herald, Benjamin Ivry advised Green's admirers that Green's "candor" might surprise, but the battle Green fought between the sensual and the spiritual was unchanged: "Chastity remains a cherished virtue, even if Green is unable to attain it."

=== Personal life ===
For many years Green was the companion of Robert de Saint-Jean, a journalist, whom he first met in November 1924. Green documented their sex life together in his journals. Though Green had described it as platonic in other writings and his own version of his journals, their relationship was intimate and physical. They lived as a couple for most of the inter-war years; theirs was an open relationship and each had multiple sex partners, whom they occasionally shared. They frequented the popular gay clubs of Paris. They traveled together throughout Europe, Tunisia, and the US in the 1920s and 1930s, and spent months together in London in 1936 and 1937.

When France fell to the Nazis in 1940, Saint-Jean was deputy chief of staff to the French minister of information and his writing had made him a personal enemy of German foreign minister Joachim von Ribbentrop. Green arranged for him to gain entry to Portugal and then transfer to the US.

In his later years, Green adopted as his son Éric Jourdan, a gay novelist, who acted as the executor of Green's estate until his own death in 2015. (Note: Éric Jourdan's performance as executor brought harsh criticism: "a mediocre, if not insignificant, novelist with a mischievous and money-grubbing character")

== Writing ==
Novels

He began work on a novel set in the pre-Civil War American South while visiting the US in 1933. He abandoned the two chapters he had completed upon learning that Margaret Mitchell's Gone With the Wind was nearing publication. His first volume set in 1850–54, Les pays lointains only appeared in 1987. The second set bringing the story to 1861, Les étoiles du Sud, in 1989. They were published in English as The Distant Lands and The Stars of the South in 1991 and 1993. The third and final volume, entitled Dixie in both languages, continued the action to the autumn of 1862 and was published in both French and English versions in 1995.

Journals

In France, both during his life and today, Green's reputation rests principally not on his novels, but on his journals, which spanned the years 1919 to 1998, and which he edited and published in nineteen volumes. These volumes provide a chronicle of his literary and religious life, and a unique window on the artistic and literary scene in Paris over a span of eighty years. The posthumous republication of the full text of his journals, from which Green had cut half the text, demonstrated that Green's version had included about half of his journals' content and had suppressed details of his and others' sexual behavior and candid opinions.

Autobiography

He published four autobiographical volumes between 1963 and 1974. The first three volumes, published in 1963, 1964, and 1966, covered the years 1900 to 1922, with the second and third volumes devoted to just the last six of those years. They dramatized his childhood and the years before he began keeping his journals. The first volume exploring "faith, love and the nature of home and memory", focused on his mother while presenting a self-portrait of "fluid contradictions", "ascetic in his aspirations but frankly alive to every sensual stimulus".

Writings in English

Green ordinarily wrote in French and rarely in English. A notable exception was the memoir Memories of Happy Days (1942), which was only published posthumously in French as Souvenirs des jours heureux (2007).

He translated a few of his own works. These were: two collections of texts–essays, poems, autobiographical texts, and short stories–in both languages, Le langage et son double (1985) and L'homme et son ombre (1991); and the play Sud (1953) as South (1959). Le langage et son double (1985) (English title: Language and its Shadow) used a side-by-side English–French format that facilitated direct comparison. Playing on his bilingual abilities and French-American identity, the volume identifies its author as "Julian Green" and its translator as "Julien Green". A close examination of the texts suggests that Green adopted a different voice in each language, evidenced by "a plethora of semantic discrepancies". He re-wrote as his translated.

== Selected works ==
=== Journals ===
Journal, 1938–2006; edited by Green

- On est si sérieux quand on a 19 ans (1919–1924), Fayard, 1993.
- I, Les Années faciles (1926-1934), Plon, 1938.
- II, Derniers beaux jours (1935-1939), Plon, 1939.
- III, Devant la porte sombre (1940-1943), Plon, 1946.
- IV, L'Œil de l'ouragan (1943-1945), Plon, 1949.
- V, Le Revenant (1946-1950), Plon, 1951.
- VI, Le Miroir intérieur (1950-1954), Plon, 1955.
- VII, Le Bel aujourd'hui (1955-1958), Plon, 1958.
- VIII, Vers l'invisible (1958-1967), Plon, 1967.
- IX, Ce qui reste de jour (1966-1972), Plon, 1972.
- X, La Bouteille à la mer (1972-1976), Plon, 1976.
- XI, La Terre est si belle… (1976-1978), Le Seuil, 1982.
- XII, La Lumière du monde (1978-1981), Le Seuil, 1983.
- XIII, L'Arc-en-ciel (1981-1984), Le Seuil, 1988.
- XIV, L'Expatrié (1984-1990), Le Seuil, 1990.
- XV, L'Avenir n'est à personne (1990-1992), Fayard, 1993.
- XVI, Pourquoi suis-je moi ? (1993-1996), Fayard, 1996.
- XVII, En avant par-dessus les tombes (1996-1997), Fayard, 2001.
- XVIII, Le Grand large du soir (1997-1998), Flammarion, 2006.

English translations of selected entries

- Personal Record 1928–1939, translated by Jocelyn Godefroi, Hamish Hamilton, 1940
- Diary 1928–1957, translated by Anne Green, Collins Harvill, 1964, includes some entries found in the Godefroi translation)

Journal intégral (unexpurgated text)

- Journal intégral, 1919–1940, Robert Laffont, collection Bouquins, 2019, 1376 p.
- Toute ma vie, journal intégral 2 1940–1945, Robert Laffont, collection Bouquins, 2021, 1408 p.
- Toute ma vie, journal intégral 3 1946–1950, Robert Laffont, collection Bouquins, 2021, 1056 p.
- Toute ma vie, journal intégral 4 1951–1958, Robert Laffont, collection Bouquins, 2025, 1177 p.

=== Autobiographical ===
- Memories of Happy Days (1942), written and first published in English
  - Souvenirs des jours heureux, Flammarion, Paris (2007)
- Memories of Evil Days, edited by Jean-Pierre J. Piriou, University Press of Virginia (1976)
- Autobiography:
  - I: Partir avant le jour (1900–1916), Grasset, Paris, 1963
    - translated as The Green Paradise, Marion Boyars (1993)
  - II: Mille Chemins ouverts (1916–1919), Grasset, Paris, 1964
    - translated as The War at Sixteen, Marion Boyars (1993)
  - III: Terre lointaine (1919–1922), Grasset, Paris, 1966
    - translated as Love in America, Marion Boyars (1994)
  - IV: Jeunesse, (1922–1929), Plon, Paris, 1974
    - translated as Restless Youth, Marion Boyars (1996)
  - Jeunes années, 1985; reissue of the four volumes of the autobiography

=== Novels ===
- Mont-Cinère (Avarice House, 1926)
- Suite anglaise (1927)
- Le voyageur sur la terre (1927)
- Adrienne Mesurat (The Closed Garden, 1927)
- Léviathan (The Dark Journey, 1929)
- L'autre sommeil (The Other Sleep, 1930)
- Épaves (The Strange River, 1932) (Note: Louis Kronenberger found Strange River less successful than his earlier works Avarice House and The Dark Journey.)
- Le visionnaire (The Dreamer, 1934)
- Minuit (Midnight, 1936)
- Varouna (Then Shall the Dust Return, 1940)
- Si j'étais vous... (If I Were You, 1947)
- Moïra (Moira, 1950)
- Le malfaiteur (The Transgressor, 1956)
- Chaque homme dans sa nuit (Each Man in His Darkness, 1960; Each in His Darkness 1961)
- L'autre (The Other One, 1971), translated by Bernard Wall, Harcourt Brace, Collins (1973)
- Qui sommes-nous? (1972)
- La Nuit des fantômes (1976)
- Le Mauvais lieu (1977)
- Dans la gueule du temps (1979)
- Histoires de vertige (1984)
- Dixie trilogy
  - Les Pays lointains (The Distant Lands, Dixie I, 1987)
  - Les Étoiles du Sud (The Stars of the South, Dixie II, 1989)
  - Dixie (Dixie III, 1994)

=== Plays ===
- Sud (South, 1953)
- L'ennemi (1954)
- L'ombre (1956)
- Demain n'existe pas (1979)
- L'Automate (1979–1980)
- L'Étudiant roux (1993)

=== Non-fiction ===
- Pamphlet contre les catholiques de France (1924)
- Un puritain homme de lettres: Nathaniel Hawthorne (1928), criticism
- La fin d'un monde: juin 1940 (1992), a contemporary account of his flight from France in 1940. His manuscript was lost sometime after 1946 and found in 1991.
- To Leave Before Dawn (1967), first English translation, by Anne Green, of his "Partir avant le jour", a recollection of adolescence
- La liberté chérie (1974)
- Ce qu'il faut d'amour à l'homme (1978), a spiritual autobiography
- Une grande amitié (1979)
- Frère François (God's Fool: The Life and Times of Francis of Assisi, 1983)
- Paris, Champ Vallon (1984) (published in a bi-lingual French/English edition, Marion Boyars, 1991)
- Jeunesse immortelle (1988)
- The Apprentice Writer: Essays, Marion Boyars, 1993

== Adaptations ==
Several of Green's works of fiction have been adapted into films: Adrienne Mesurat (1953, television film), starring Anouk Aimée; Leviathan (1962 film), starring Louis Jourdan and Lilli Palmer, for which Green wrote the dialogue; La Dame de pique (1965 film); Adrienne Mésurat (1969, German television film); Mont-Cinère (1970, television film), with a screenplay by Robert de Saint-Jean; (Note: In Le Monde Jacques Siclier faulted Saint-Jean's screenplay as "far too theatrical, where the characters talk constantly, explaining what should be suggested".) Si j'étais vous (1971, television film), starring Patrick Dewaere.

The stage play South was adapted for a British television production in 1959, starring Peter Wyngarde. It is the earliest known television drama dealing with homosexuality. An opera by Kenton Cole based on Sud premiered in Marseille in 1965 and received "hostile" reviews when staged at the Opéra de Paris in 1972. Ned Rorem wrote songs to paragraphs he translated from L’Autre Sommeil.
