= Hans Hüttig =

German SS functionary and Nazi concentration camp commandant

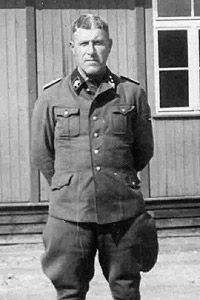
- Hüttig as commander of the Herzogenbusch concentration camp sub-camp in Vught, The Netherlands
- Born: 5 April 1894; Dresden, German Empire
- Died: 23 February 1980 (aged 85); Wachenheim, West Germany
- Military career
- Allegiance: Nazi Germany
- Branch: Schutzstaffel
- Service years: 1932–1945
- Unit: SS-Totenkopfverbände

Hans Benno Hüttig (5 April 1894 – 23 February 1980) was a German SS functionary and Nazi concentration camp commandant.

== Early years ==
Hans Hüttig was born on 5 April 1894. The son of a carpenter, Hüttig's father would eventually open a shop selling photographic equipment and this became the family trade, with Hans Hüttig's brother a founder of Zeiss Ikon. Sent to a boarding school in South Germany, he attempted to enter the army in 1911 but failed the exam and returned home to work as a salesman in his father's shop. Early in 1914, he left the shop to take a post with an import-export company in German East Africa.

Following the outbreak of the First World War, Hüttig enlisted in the German Imperial Army, seeing action in the East African Campaign and eventually rising to the rank of Feldwebel. Wounded in December 1917, the military hospital where he was being treated was captured by the British Army. Thereafter, Hüttig was sent to a POW camp in Cairo where he was held for two years.

== Joining the Nazis ==
Hüttig returned to Germany in March 1920, working initially at the shop again before filling on a number of clerical jobs. Hüttig joined the right-wing Der Stahlhelm in 1925 although he claimed that this was largely to feel a sense of belonging rather than because of any deep political convictions. After running his own photography shop (which closed in 1930), Hüttig enlisted in the SS in March 1932 at age 37 as an unpaid volunteer and he joined the Nazi Party soon afterwards.

== Concentration camps ==
Following the Nazis' seizure of national power in 1933, Hüttig was offered and accepted a full-time billet with the SS as part of the SS-Totenkopfverbände (Camp SS). For the next six years, Hüttig spent his time rotating through the concentration camps and being trained for a career in them. His first assignment came when he was appointed deputy to Karl Otto Koch, commandant of Buchenwald concentration camp and already known to Hüttig from Dresden. At Buchenwald, Hüttig was praised by his superiors for his attitude whilst inmates would later testify to his personal cruelty.

After his time at Buchenwald, Hüttig saw service at Sachsenhausen concentration camp and Flossenbürg concentration camp and in both gained a reputation as a troubleshooter who was suitable for special tasks. Thus he was called upon to oversee the construction of a new facility at Natzweiler-Struthof in Alsace. Following this he spent time in occupied Norway, overseeing the construction of both concentration camps and prisons. Whilst there he commanded the security at Grini concentration camp outside Oslo. This assignment ended in February 1944 with his transfer to Herzogenbusch concentration camp in the Netherlands as commandant following the removal of Adam Grünewald for his part in the Bunker Tragedy that took place in January 1944 and had caused uproar in the local area. Hüttig oversaw the closure of Herzogenbusch by October 1944 before returning to Germany to serve out the war working in a police station.

== Post-war ==
After the war, Hüttig was held in Allied internment on suspicion of war crimes. However, he was not put on trial until June 1954. Hüttig was found guilty and sentenced to life in prison in solitary confinement on 2 July 1954 by a French military court in Metz. In 1956, he was released from detention and led a discreet life at home, until his death in 1980 in Wachenheim.

Hüttig was one of only a handful of camp commanders interviewed by Israeli historian Tom Segev for his book on the commandants Soldiers of Evil. During the course of the interview, he admitted to Segev that "I knew very well what I was going to do in the SS".

== Decorations ==
SS-Rank(s):

- SS-Untersturmführer 31.1.1937,
- SS-Obersturmführer 12.9.1937,
- SS-Hauptsturmführer 11.9. 1938,
- Last promotion to the rank of SS-Sturmbannführer in 30.1.1942.

Awards:

- DRL-Sports Badge in Bronze,
- Honor Cross of The World War 1914–1918,
- Wound Badge in Black 1918,
- Der Stahlhelm Membership Badge,
- NSDAP 10 Year Long Service Medal,
- SS-Ehrenring,
- Iron Cross 2nd Class 1939,
- SS-Ehrendegen Reichführer-SS,
- SS Long Service Medal.
