= Herzogenbusch concentration camp =

Nazi concentration camp in the Netherlands (1943–1945)

Coordinates: 51°39′57″N 5°15′32″E

Herzogenbusch
- Nazi concentration camp
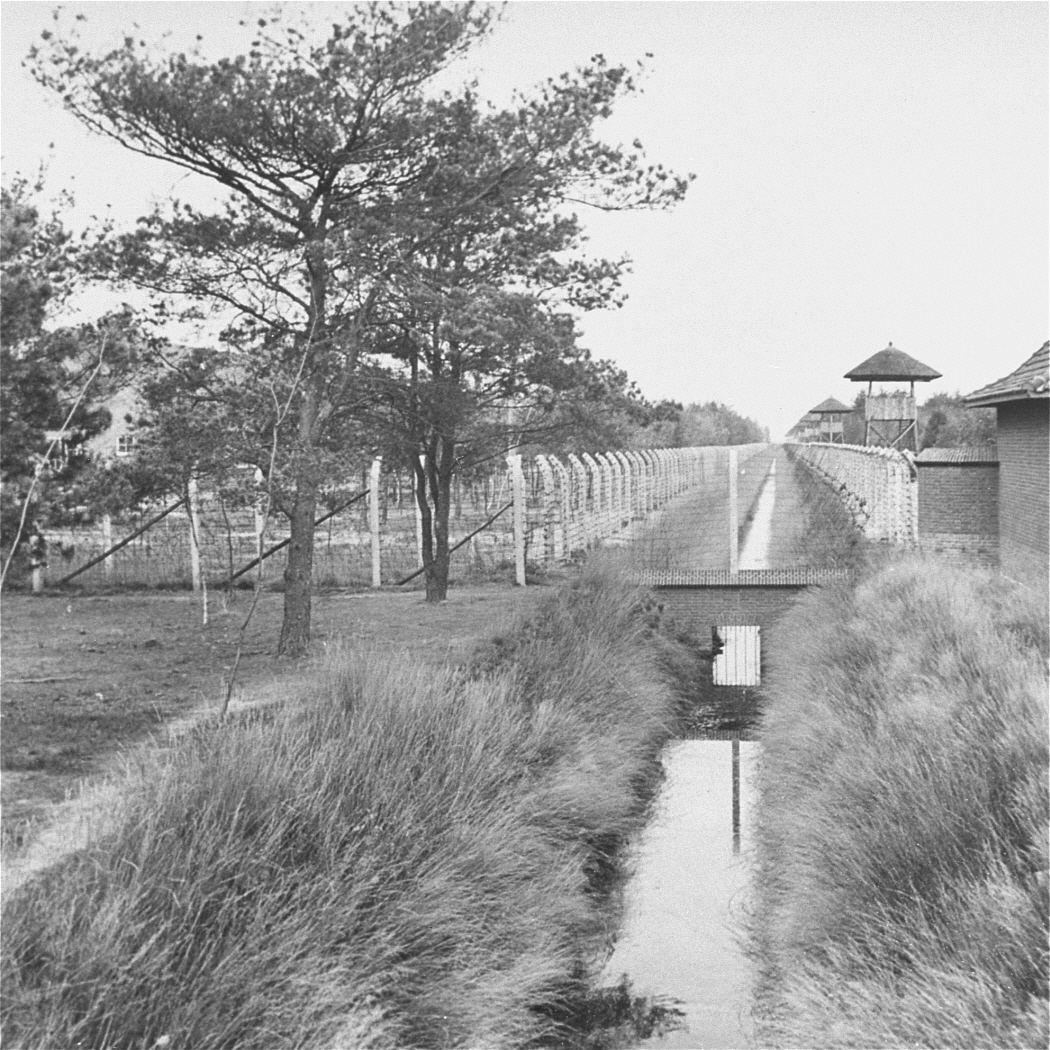
- Camp perimeter fence, 1945

- Location of the camp in the Netherlands
- Other names: Kamp Vught (Dutch); Konzentrationslager Herzogenbusch (German)
- Location: Vught, Netherlands
- Built by: Nazi Germany
- Operated by: SS
- Commandant: Karl Chmielewski (5 January 1943 – October 1943); Adam Grünewald (October 1943 – January 1944); Hans Hüttig (February 1944 – September 1944)
- First built: 1942
- Operational: January 1943; 26 October 1944
- Inmates: Jews, Gypsies, political prisoners
- Killed: 749
- Liberated by: 51st Highland Division
- Notable inmates: Anton Constandse, Helga Deen, David Koker
- Website: www.nmkampvught.nl

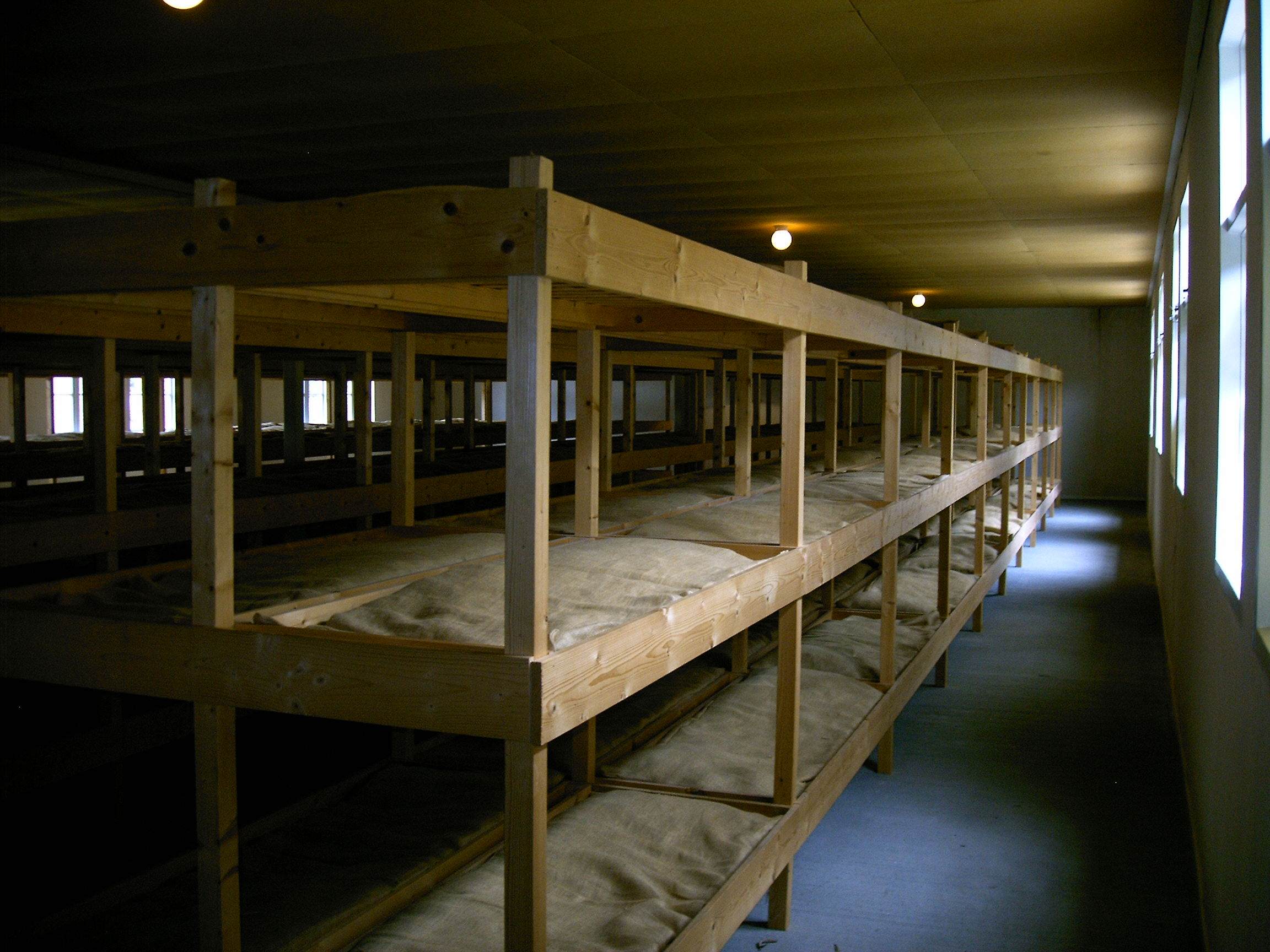
Beds in the barracks of the camp

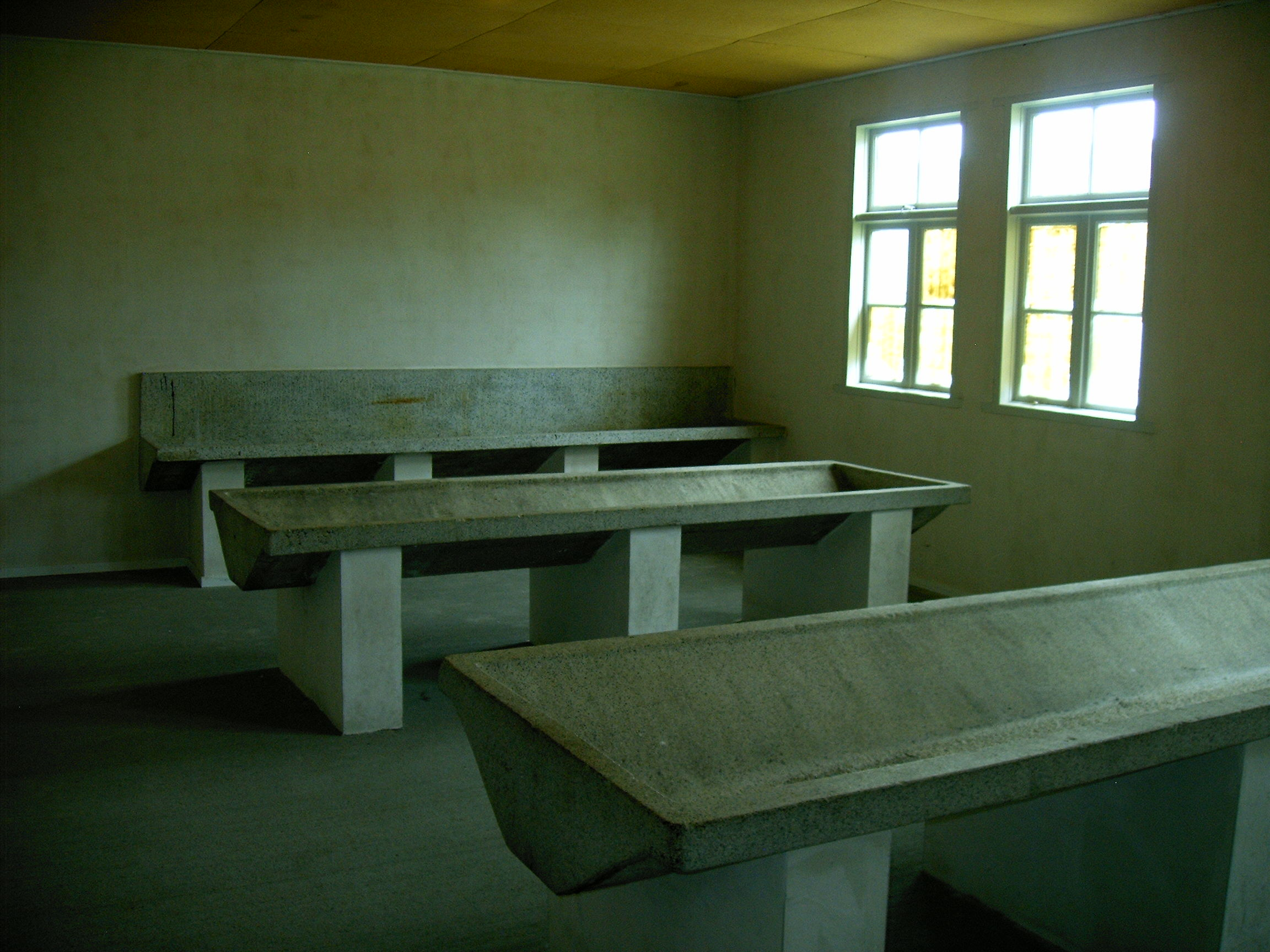
Washing area for the prisoners

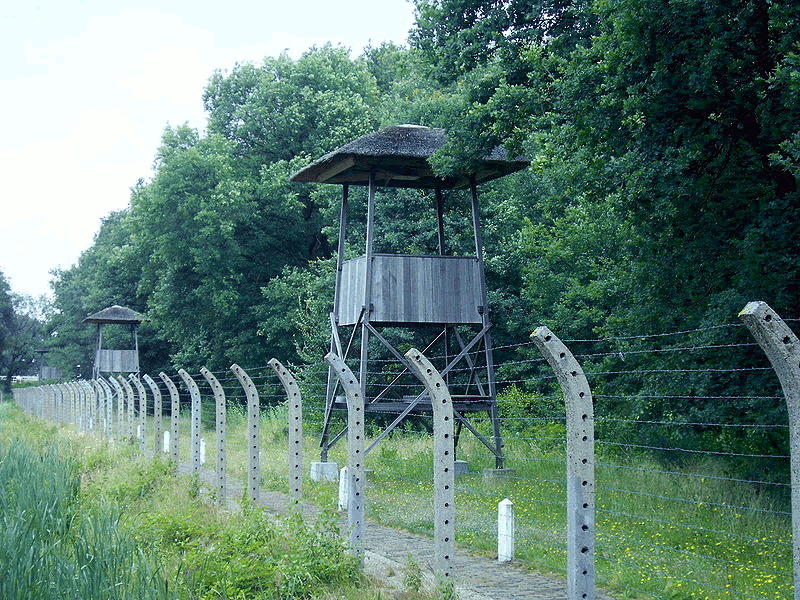
Watchtowers and barbed wire fences in the camp

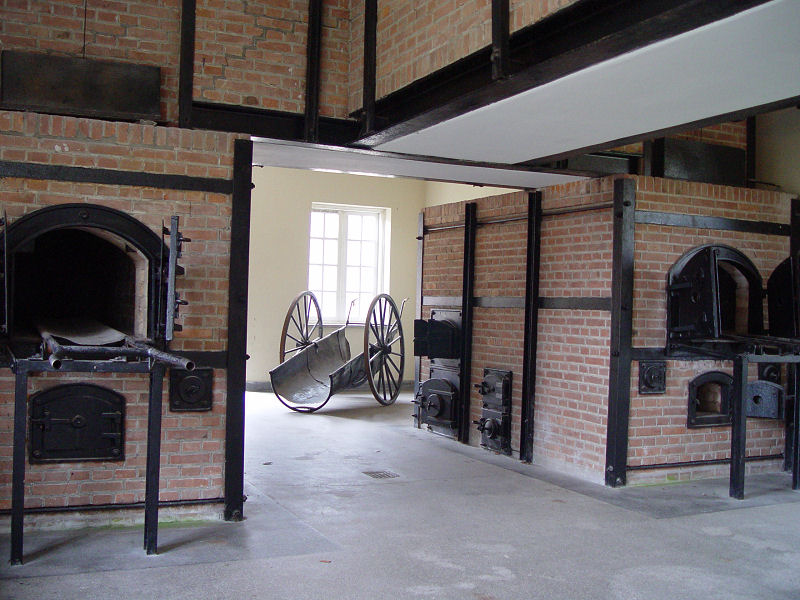
The crematorium in the camp

Herzogenbusch (German: [ˌhɛʁtsoːɡn̩ˈbʊʃ]; Dutch: Kamp Vught [kɑmp ˈvʏxt]) was a Nazi concentration camp located in Vught near the city of 's-Hertogenbosch, Netherlands. The camp was opened in 1943 and held 31,000 prisoners. 749 prisoners died in the camp, and the others were transferred to other camps shortly before Herzogenbusch was liberated by the Allied Forces in 1944. After the war, the camp was used as a prison for Germans and for Dutch collaborators. Today there is a visitors' center which includes exhibitions and a memorial remembering the camp and its victims.

== History ==
During World War II, Nazi Germany occupied the Netherlands from 1940 to 1945. In 1942, the Nazis transported Jewish and other prisoners from the Netherlands via Amersfoort and Westerbork transit camps to Auschwitz concentration camp, except for 850 prisoners sent to Mauthausen concentration camp. When Amersfoort and Westerbork proved to be too small to handle the large number of prisoners, the Schutzstaffel (SS) decided to build a concentration camp in Vught, near the city of 's-Hertogenbosch.

Construction of the camp at Herzogenbusch, the German name for 's-Hertogenbosch, started in 1942. The camp was modelled on concentration camps in Germany. The first prisoners, who arrived in 1943, had to finish the construction of the camp, which was in use between January 1943 and September 1944. During that period, it held nearly 31,000 prisoners: Jews, political prisoners, resistance fighters, Gypsies, Jehovah’s Witnesses, homosexuals, homeless people, black market traders, criminals, and hostages.

At least 749 men, women and children died in Herzogenbusch due to hunger, sickness and abuse. Of those, 329 were murdered at the execution site just outside the camp. As Allied forces approached Herzogenbusch, the camp was evacuated and the prisoners were transferred to concentration camps further east. By 4–5 September 1944, the women inmates had been sent to Ravensbrück Concentration Camp, and the men to Sachsenhausen concentration camp. On 26 October 1944, Scottish troops of the 7th Black Watch liberated the camp during Operation Pheasant after fighting a rear guard of SS personnel left to defend the nearly evacuated facility. There were around 500–600 prisoners left alive, who were due to be executed that afternoon, and whose lives were saved by the arrival of the liberating forces. About 500 inmates were also discovered dead in piles near the gates, having been executed the very morning of the day the camp was liberated.

In the first years following the war, the camp was used for the detention of Germans, Dutch SS men, alleged collaborators and their children, and war criminals. At first, they were guarded by Allied soldiers, but shortly after by the Dutch.

=== Diary of David Koker ===
A Jewish student, David Koker (1921–1945), lived with his family in Amsterdam until he was captured on the night of 11 February 1943 and transported to Herzogenbusch camp. During his internment, he wrote a diary, which was smuggled out of the camp in parts; it is now complete and conserved. It records events from 11 February 1943 until 8 February 1944. Koker wrote poems in his diary and taught Jewish children in the camp.

On 2 June 1944, he and his family were transported by train to Auschwitz-Birkenau. Koker got the chance to throw a letter from the train. The family was later transported to the Groß-Rosen camp (Langenbielau).

Koker's mother and brother Max survived the war, but David died during a transport of sick people to Dachau in 1945.

=== Diary of Helga Deen ===
Helga Deen (Stettin, Germany, 6 April 1925 – Sobibor, 16 July 1943) was the author of a diary, discovered in 2004, which describes her time in the Herzogenbusch concentration camp in Vught, where she was taken during World War II at the age of 18.

After her last diary entry, in early July 1943, Helga Deen was deported to Sobibor extermination camp and murdered. She was 18 years old.

=== Corrie ten Boom ===
Corrie ten Boom (1892–1983) and her sister Betsie (1885–1944) were detained at the Herzogenbusch camp (after four months in Scheveningen) for sheltering Jews and others at their Haarlem home from the occupation authorities. During that time she was detailed to work at building radios in a nearby aircraft factory under a kind prisoner-foreman. Just before the camp's liberation, the sisters were sent on to Ravensbruck where Betsie died. Corrie survived captivity and the war to describe her experiences in her autobiography The Hiding Place (1971).

== Commanders ==
=== Karl Chmielewski ===
The first commander of Herzogenbusch was 39-year-old Karl Chmielewski, member of the German SS since 1932. He served before at Gusen concentration camp in Austria. During the first few months, the camp was poorly run. Prisoners received no meals, the sick were barely treated, and the quality of drinking water was very poor. He was removed from command in 1943 for stealing from the camp on a large scale. In 1961, he was tried in West Germany and sentenced to life imprisonment for his homicidal brutality towards the prisoners. Chmielewski was released from prison in 1979, on the grounds of his deteriorating mental health. He died in a mental hospital in 1991.

=== Adam Grünewald ===
The second commander was 40-year-old Adam Grünewald, member of German Schutzstaffel since 1934. Immediately after assuming command over the camp, he imposed very strict rules. In January 1944, he ordered that a group of female prisoners was to be put into one cell. That resulted in what has become known as the Bunker Tragedy: ten of the women packed into the cell died during the night. His superiors, unhappy that the tragedy was leaked to the press, brought him before an SS judge. Grünewald was initially sentenced to 3.5 years in prison for excessive cruelty, but was pardoned after serving a month. However, he was then stripped of his rank and ordered to fight on the Eastern front as a common soldier. Grünewald survived for nearly a year before being killed in action in January 1945.

=== Hans Hüttig ===
The last commander of Herzogenbusch was the 50-year-old Hans Hüttig. He joined the SS in 1932 as an unpaid volunteer, and the Nazi party soon thereafter. In 1944, Huttig oversaw the evacuation and closure of the camp. After the war, Hüttig was detained, but did not go to trial for nearly a decade. He was sentenced to death in 1954, but was not executed. Hüttig was released in 1956, and died a free man in 1980.

== Current state ==
The execution site near the camp is now a national monument, with a wall bearing the names of all those who died there. The wall has suffered numerous acts of vandalism. In one case, black smears were drawn on the wall, using tar, which seeped into the stone and proved impossible to remove.

The camp was partially demolished after the war. The grounds now house an educational museum known as Nationaal Monument Kamp Vught, the Van Brederodekazerne military base, a neighbourhood for Indonesian refugees from Maluku, and the Nieuw Vosseveld high security prison. However, parts of the old camp still exist. Central to the prison, the bunker where the Bunker Tragedy occurred still stands. Large parts of the southern camp buildings are now used by the Dutch military, including the former SS barracks that have a cruciform ground plan.

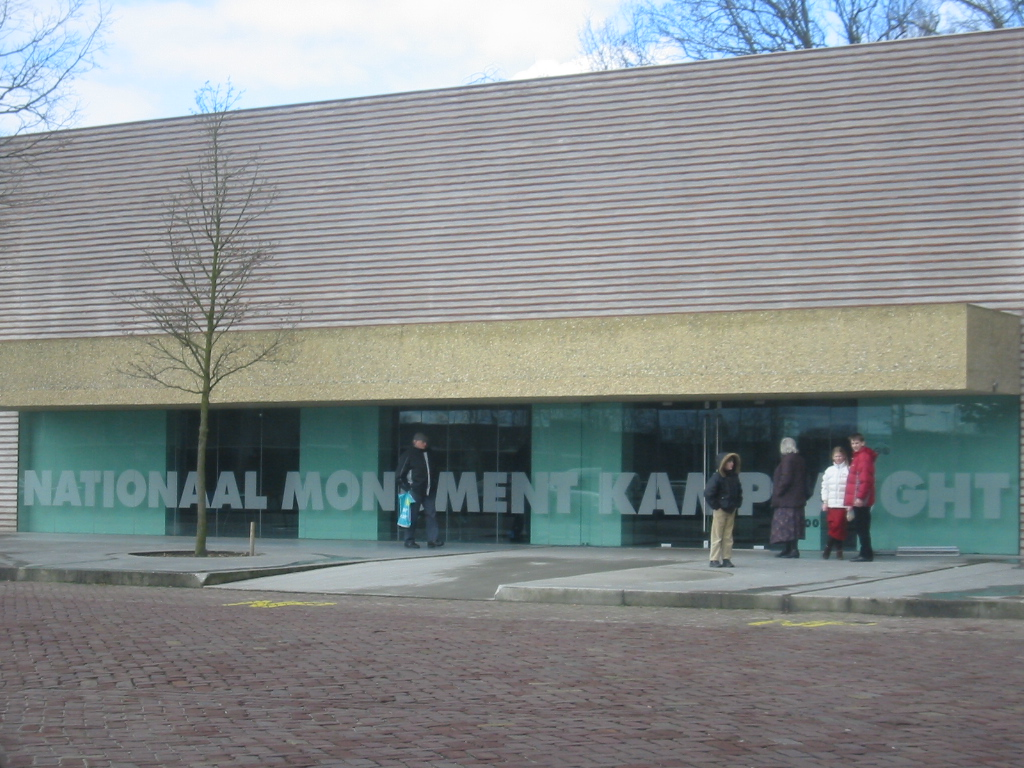
The national monument

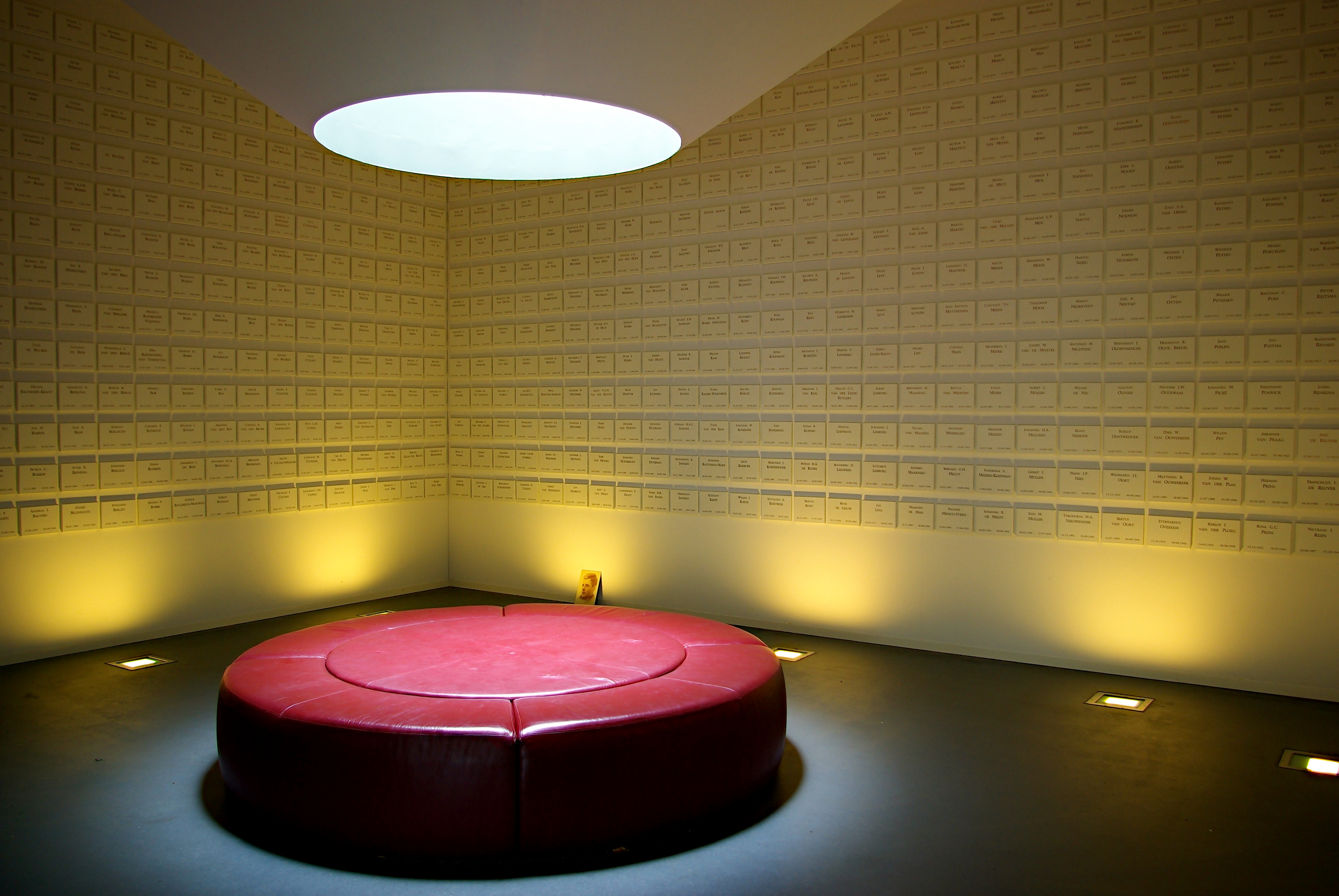
"Room for reflection"

== See also ==
- List of Nazi concentration camps
- The Holocaust in The Netherlands
