= David Koker =

Dutch Holocaust victim

- Born: David Koker; 27 November 1921; Amsterdam, Netherlands
- Died: 23 February 1945 (aged 23); Groß-Rosen/Dachau; Germany
- Occupation: Student

Notes
- He wrote a diary during his stay in Camp Vught

David Koker (27 November 1921 - 23 February 1945) was a Jewish student who lived with his family in Amsterdam until he was captured on the night of 11 February 1943 and transported to camp Vught.

David was forced to halt his studies in philosophy and history in September 1941 when the university ceased allowing Jews to study. The family did not go into hiding because they had received an exemption and believed they were safe. Still, in 1943, they were captured and transported to Camp Vught on 11 February. David spent some of his time teaching children at the camp. In July, he received a Sperre (temporary exemption from deportation) from Frits Philips and joined his "Philips Commandos". In June 1944, the "Philips-Jews" were transported to Auschwitz-Birkenau, from where they would be sent to other camps to work for electronics companies.

David's mother and brother Max survived the war. David, however, fell ill and died during a transfer of ill people to the Dachau concentration camp due in part to his illness as well as hypothermia in February 1945. His father died of exhaustion in LangenBilau, a subcamp of Groß-Rosen.

Koker had published in 1941 Modern-Hebreeuwse poëzie. The booklet (87 pages) was a bilingual edition of modern Hebrew poetry, with translations in Dutch. The co-translator was J. Melkman, pseudonym of Jozeph Michman (1914-2009). It was published by Joachimsthal in Amsterdam.

== The Diary ==
During his internment, he wrote a diary which was smuggled out of the camp, pieces at a time. The diary is maintained complete, starting on 11 February 1943 and ending on 8 February 1944. In addition to standard entries, David also used the diary to write poetry.

On 2 June 1944, while the family was being transported to Auschwitz-Birkenau, David managed to throw a letter from the train, an excerpt of which read:

(Netherlands) : Lieve vrinden, we zijn nu dicht bij de grens. Het is wel teleurstellend, maar we waren erop voorbereid en zijn vol vertrouwen. Ik denk veel aan jullie. (...) Ik heb alle brieven en foto's bij me. M'n liefste bezit. Wanneer zien we elkaar weer? Dat zal nu wel lang duren. Maar erdoor komen we. (...) Heel veel liefs jongens, bedankt voor alles. Tot ziens.

(United Kingdom) : 'Dear friends, we are close to the border now. It is very disappointing, but we were prepared for it and remain hopeful. I think a lot about you. (...) I've got all your letters and photos with me. My dearest possessions. When will we see each other again? That will take a long time. But we shall survive. (...) Lots of love guys, thanks for everything. Goodbye.

The diary was published in 1977 with the name Dagboek geschreven in Vught (Diary Written in Vught). The editor was Koker's best friend Karel van het Reve, a professor of Slavic languages and literature, who during the war collected and kept the smuggled diary pieces. The manuscript was stored at the Dutch Institute for War Documentation (NIOD). It has been translated into English and was published in 2012 under the title At the Edge of the Abyss: A Concentration Camp Diary, 1943-1944. Koker's Diary was in 2012 finalist for the Jewish Book Award in the Holocaust category.

== See also ==
- List of posthumous publications of Holocaust victims
- List of Holocaust diarists
- Helga Deen
- Anne Frank
- Etty Hillesum
