= Karl Chmielewski =

Nazi war criminal (1903–1991)

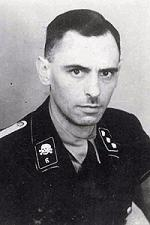
- Chmielewski in the 1940s
- Born: 16 July 1903; Frankfurt am Main, German Empire
- Died: 1 December 1991 (aged 88); Bernau am Chiemsee, Germany
- Occupation: Commandant of Herzogenbusch concentration camp (1943)
- Status: Deceased
- Motive: Nazism
- Convictions: Nazi Germany; Rape; Embezzlement; West Germany; Murder; Perjury; Fraud; Bigamy
- Penalty: Nazi Germany; 15 years imprisonment West Germany; Life imprisonment with hard labour

Karl Chmielewski (16 July 1903 – 1 December 1991) was a German SS officer and concentration camp commandant. Such was his cruelty, he was dubbed Teufel von Gusen or the Devil of Gusen.

Chmielewski joined the SS whilst unemployed in 1932 and joined the Nazi Party the following year. After initially serving in the office of Heinrich Himmler, he was transferred to the Columbia concentration camp in 1935, before moving to Sachsenhausen concentration camp the following year. He was promoted to Untersturmführer in 1938 and attached to the Schutzhaftlagerführung, the 'Protective custody' units of the SS-Totenkopfverbände.

From 1940 to 1942 Chmielewski, by then a Hauptsturmführer, served as Schutzhaftlagerführer at Gusen concentration camp, and it was there that he developed a reputation for extreme brutality. He then became commandant of the newly established Herzogenbusch concentration camp in the Netherlands, where he further developed a reputation for cruelty.

Amongst the claims made against him was that during inspections he ordered the drowning of prisoners in buckets of water. Fellow camp commandant Franz Ziereis claimed after the war that Chmielewski had used the skin of prisoners to make things such as wallets and book bindings, something Ziereis claimed was strictly forbidden by the Nazi authorities. During his reign at Herzogenbusch, Chmielewski gained a reputation for corruption, and he was eventually tried for personally enriching himself through stealing diamonds from prisoners. He was deprived of his position and rank in 1943, being succeeded as commandant by Adam Grünewald. In 1944, an SS court sentenced Chmielewski to 15 years in prison for rape and embezzlement. He spent the rest of the war as an inmate at Dachau concentration camp.

Chmielewski disappeared into Austria after the war. By 1953, he was back in Germany, under an assumed identity, where he had taken up farming. He was tried that year for perjury, fraud, and bigamy, and sentenced to a year in prison. After his real identity was established, he was arrested by West German police in January 1959, accused of nearly two hundred counts of murder. At his trial in 1961, he was found guilty of causing the deaths of prisoners through his brutality, and was sentenced to life imprisonment with hard labour. The court pronounced him a sadist who took pleasure in killing prisoners, whom he did not see as human, by scalding them with boiling water.

He was released from prison in March 1979, on mental health grounds, and spent his last years in a care institution at Chiemsee.
