= Helga Deen =

Jewish diarist and Holocaust victim (1925–1943)

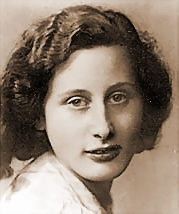
- Helga Deen
- Born: 6 April 1925; Stettin, Germany
- Died: 16 July 1943 (aged 18); Sobibór extermination camp, German-occupied Poland
- Known for: Diary written during her stay in Camp Vught and discovered in 2004

Helga Deen (6 April 1925 – 16 July 1943) was a Jewish diarist whose diary was discovered in 2004, which describes her stay in a Dutch prison camp, Kamp Vught, where she was brought during World War II at the age of 18.

== Biography ==
Deen was half-Dutch. Initially her father lived with his German GP wife in Germany, but moved back to the Netherlands as persecution increased. Her mother worked for a time as a doctor at a concentration camp at Vught. She was given leave to remain but chose to accompany her family to Sobibor, where she became one of the millions who was murdered in the Nazis' gas chambers.

After her last diary entry, in early July 1943, Helga Deen was deported to Sobibór extermination camp and murdered in the gas chambers shortly after she arrived in the camp. She was 18 years old.

== Diary ==
Upon her arrival at Camp Vught in April 1943, she started writing in her diary, a school notebook. Deen wrote the diary for her boyfriend, Kees van den Berg, who kept it hidden after the war. After his death, his son presented the diary to archivists in Tilburg.

== Memorials ==
A memorial stone to Helga and her family has been placed by a member of the Dutch Sobibor Foundation on the pathway which used to lead to the gas chambers (called the "Road to Heaven").

== See also ==
- List of posthumous publications of Holocaust victims
- List of Holocaust diarists
- Anne Frank
- Etty Hillesum
- David Koker
- Selma Wijnberg-Engel
