= Etty Hillesum =

Dutch Jewish diarist (1914–1943)

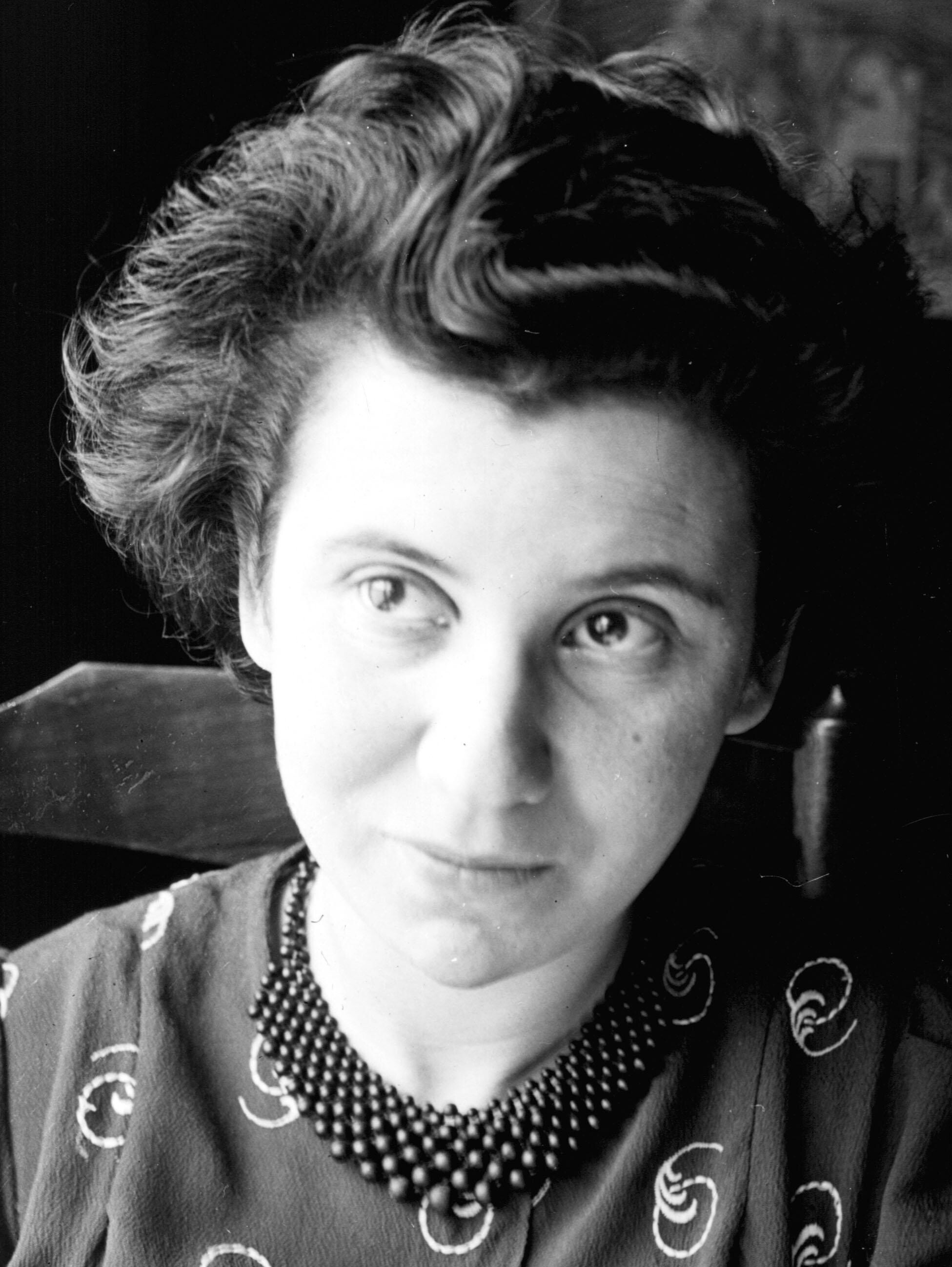
- Hillesum in 1939
- Born: Esther Hillesum; 15 January 1914; Middelburg, Netherlands
- Died: 30 November 1943 (aged 29); Auschwitz-Birkenau, German-occupied Poland
- Occupation: Writer
- Known for: Diary and letters from camp Westerbork

Esther "Etty" Hillesum (15 January 1914 – 30 November 1943) was a Dutch Jewish author of confessional letters and diaries which describe both her religious awakening and the persecutions of Jewish people in Amsterdam during the German occupation. In 1943, she was deported and murdered in the Auschwitz concentration camp.

== Life ==
Esther Hillesum was born on 15 January 1914 in her family home in the town of Middelburg, the oldest of the three children – she had two brothers: Jacob, or "Jaap" (1916–1945), and Michael, or "Mischa" (1920–1944) – of Levie Hillesum (1880–1943) and Riva Bernstein (1881–1943). After completing school in 1932, she moved to Amsterdam to study law and Slavic languages. There, she met Hendrik (Hans) J. Wegerif, with whom she had a relationship that she describes in her diaries.

Etty Hillesum began writing her diary in March 1941, possibly at the suggestion of her analyst Julius Spier, whom she had been consulting for a month. Although his patient, Etty also became his secretary, friend, and, eventually, his lover. His influence on her spiritual development is apparent in her diaries; as well as teaching her how to deal with her depressive and egocentric episodes, he introduced her to the Bible and St. Augustine, and helped her develop a deeper understanding of the work of Rilke and Dostoyevsky.

Her diaries record the increasing anti-Jewish measures imposed by the occupying German army, and the growing uncertainty about the fate of fellow Jews who had been deported by them. As well as forming a record of oppression, her diaries describe her spiritual development and deepening faith in God.

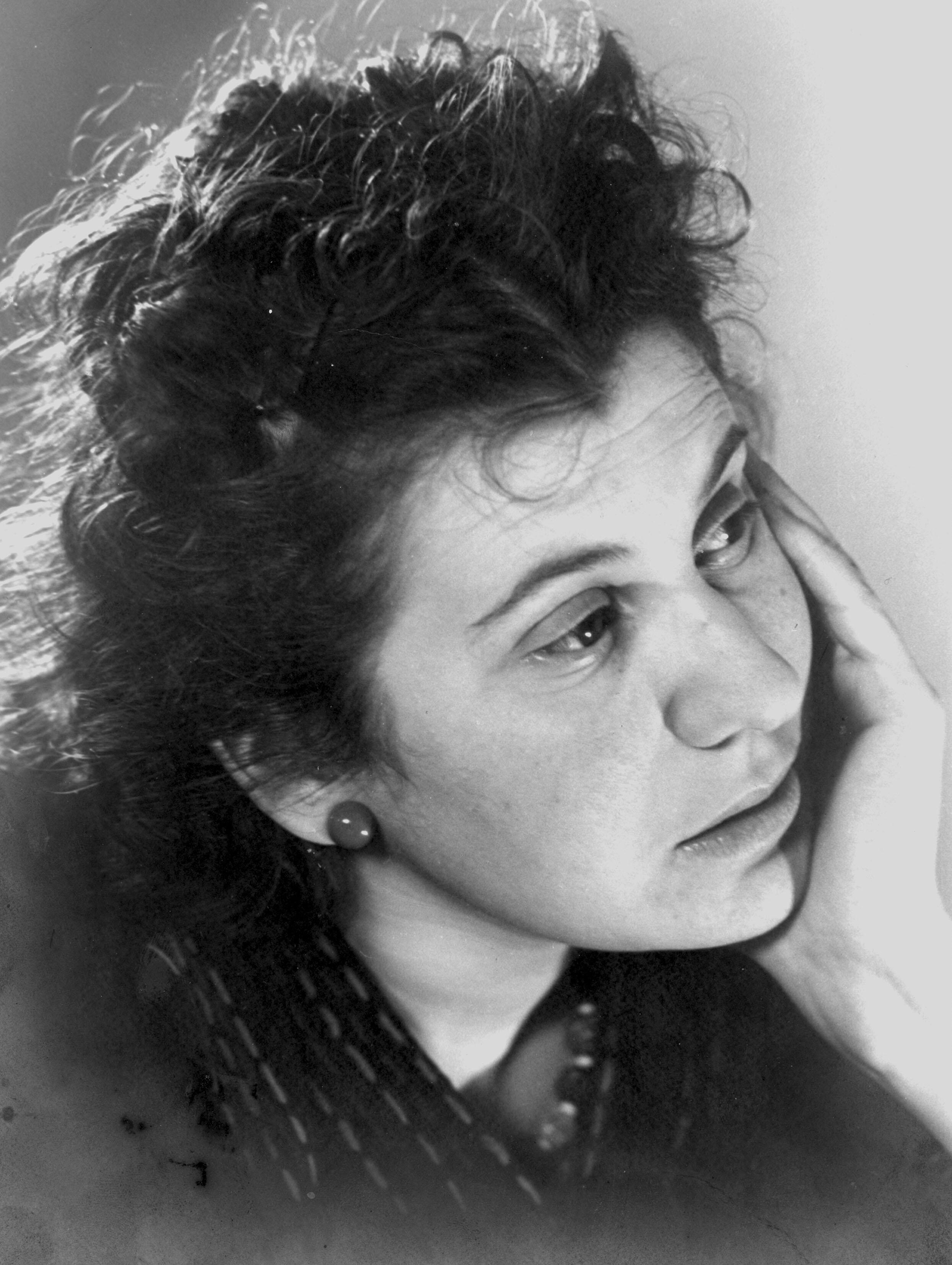
Hillesum, c. 1940

When round-ups of Jews intensified in July 1942, Etty took on administrative duties for the "Jewish Council", voluntarily transferring to a department of "Social Welfare for People in Transit" at Westerbork transit camp. She worked there for a month, but returned in June 1943, by which time she had refused offers to go into hiding, much to the consternation of her non-Jewish friends. This refusal was due to her belief that her duty was to support others scheduled to be transported from Westerbork to the concentration camps in German-occupied Poland and Germany. On 5 July 1943, her personnel status was suddenly revoked, and she became a camp internee, along with her father, mother, and brother Mischa.

On 7 September 1943, the family was deported from Westerbork to Auschwitz. Only Jaap Hillesum did not go with them; he arrived in Westerbork after their removal, and in February 1944, he was sent to Bergen-Belsen, dying shortly after its liberation in April 1945.

Etty Hillesum's parents are recorded as having died on 10 September 1943, suggesting they died in transit or were murdered immediately upon their arrival. Mischa Hillesum remained in Auschwitz until October 1943, when he was moved to the Warsaw Ghetto, where, according to the Red Cross, he died before 31 March 1944. Etty was murdered in Auschwitz on 30 November 1943.

== Personal growth and philosophy ==
Etty Hillesum's youth was chaotic and turbulent, possibly resulting from her emotionally unstable family, to which she herself referred as a "madhouse". Her diaries reflect the inner turmoil that she experiences during her young adulthood, as well as the healing and growth during the years before her murder.

Russian authors and Christian mystics likely contributed to Hillesum's understanding of spirituality. She did not strive for ecstasy, but longed to meet the depth of her own interior and life itself. Her spirituality was not confined to her intellectual understanding of a greater power and is reflected in her diaries. In the concentration camp of Westerbork, she had unusual experiences of spiritual awakenings and insight: "Those two months behind barbed wire have been the two richest and most intense months of my life, in which my highest values were so deeply confirmed. I have learnt to love Westerbork". Hillesum addressed God repeatedly in her diaries, regarding him not as a saviour, but as a power one must nurture inside of oneself: "Alas, there doesn't seem to be much You Yourself can do about our circumstances, about our lives. Neither do I hold You responsible. You cannot help us, but we must help You and defend Your dwelling place inside us to the last." Still in Amsterdam, Hillesum developed an ideology of showing others the way to their own interior in a time of great adversity – the Nazi terror. Her time at Westerbork – as reflected in her diaries – portrays the redemption of her spirit, while her body was captured and eventually murdered. She neither denies the horror of the Nazi terror, nor identifies with her victimhood. In the midst of extreme conditions, Hillesum develops an awareness of the indestructible beauty of this world. She writes during her time at Westerbork: "The sky is full of birds, the purple lupins stand up so regally and peacefully, two little old women have sat down for a chat, the sun is shining on my face – and right before our eyes, mass murder... The whole thing is simply beyond comprehension." Hillesum continuously writes from a place of great tenderness, empathy, and realisation.

Hillesum suffered great inner turmoil during her young adulthood, but increasingly transforms into a woman of maturity and wisdom. She wrote, "Everywhere things are both very good and very bad at the same time. The two are in balance, everywhere and always. I never have the feeling that I have got to make the best of things; everything is fine just as it is. Every situation, however miserable, is complete in itself and contains the good as well as the bad." In touch with the equilibrium of a bigger picture she is aware of, she continuously draws from this place to find meaning in her current reality. Hillesum saw it as her duty to assist her people in preserving their human dignity in the face of Nazi attempts to not only murder Jews but also take away their humanity.

On 7 September 1943, less than three months before her murder, she threw a postcard with her final words out of a train. The postcard read, "Opening the Bible at random I find this: 'The Lord is my high tower'. I am sitting on my rucksack in the middle of a full freight car. Father, Mother, and Mischa are a few cars away. In the end, the departure came without warning... We left the camp singing... Thank you for all your kindness and care."

== The diaries ==
Before she left for Westerbork, Etty Hillesum gave her diaries to Maria Tuinzing, with the instruction they be passed to Klaas Smelik for publication, should she not survive. Attempts to have them published proved fruitless until 1979, when Smelik's son, the director of the Etty Hillesum Research Centre, approached publisher J. G. Gaarlandt. An abridged edition of her diaries appeared in 1981 under the title Het verstoorde leven ('An Interrupted Life'), followed by a collection of her letters from Westerbork. A complete edition of her letters and diaries was published in Dutch in 1986 and translated into English in 2002. Her diaries were translated into 18 languages. Her letters were sent to friends and Hillesum's final postcard was thrown from the train in Westerbork, where it was discovered by Dutch farmers after her death.

== In popular culture ==
David Brooks sees Hillesum's ability to hold both intellectual skepticism yet humanitarian vulnerability in How to Stay Sane in Brutalizing Times.

Richard Layard has spoken with great appreciation of Hillesum's view that one must preserve one's inner self, or core.

Rowan Rheingans has drawn on Hillesum's writing, particularly on the coexistence of beauty and horror, and on allowing room for sorrow, in her album "The lines we draw together".

Palestinian writer Dina Awwad-Srour and Israeli Rabbi Emma Sham-Ba Ayalon are friends and peace activists who together created Etty Hillesum cards which contain quotes from Hillesum's writings in English, Hebrew, and Arabic. Both women were inspired by Hillesum's writings and have used the cards as the basis for a ritual commemoration on Holocaust Memorial Day in Israel/Palestine.

In 2024, the research book "The Bible of Etty Hillesum" was published in Israel by Doron Braunshtein.

The Italian music project Camera Sambô released "Remembering Etty Hillesum" in 2024.

== Publications ==
- An Interrupted Life: The Diaries of Etty Hillesum 1941–1943
- Etty Hillesum: An Interrupted Life the Diaries, 1941–1943 and Letters from Westerbork
- Etty Hillesum: Essential Writings (Modern Spiritual Masters)
- Anne Frank and Etty Hillesum: Inscribing Spirituality and Sexuality
- Etty Hillesum: Letters from Westerbork

== Research centre and museum ==
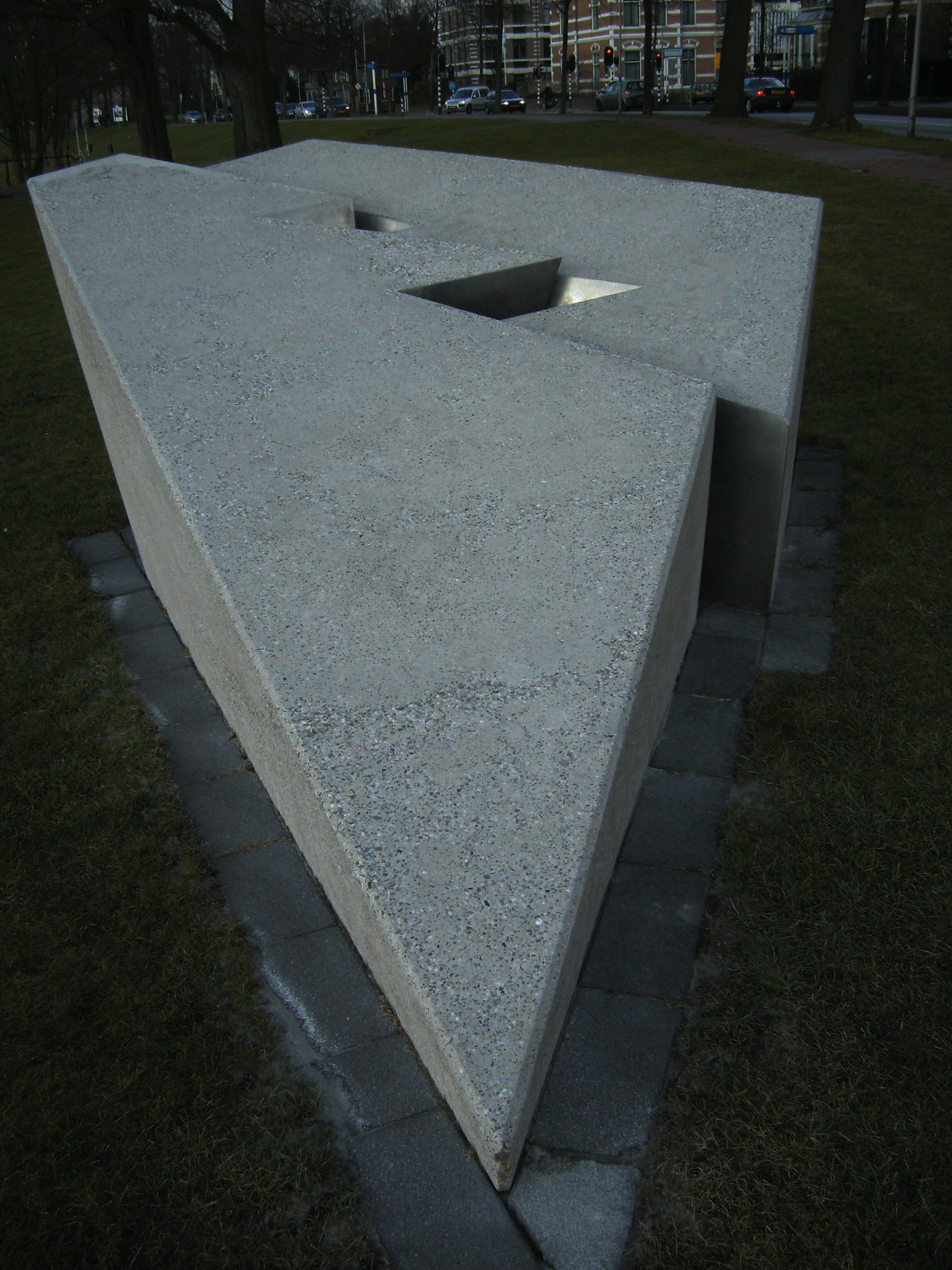
Life Interrupted (Het Verstoorde Leven). Monument in remembrance of Etty Hillesum.

On 13 June 2006, the Etty Hillesum Research Centre (EHOC) was officially opened as part of Ghent University with a celebration at Sint-Pietersplein 5. It studies and promotes the research of Hillesum's World War II letters and diaries.

The Centre is directed by Klaas A.D. Smelik, who edited and published the Complete edition of the Letters and Diaries, and teaches Hebrew and Judaism at Ghent University. Staff member Meins G. S. Coetsier is the author of Etty Hillesum and the Flow of Presence: A Voegelinian Analysis.

A monument to Etty Hillesum is located in Deventer on the riverfront, and the local secondary schools are named after her. There is also a modest museum dedicated to her memory, the Etty Hillesum Centre, housed at Roggestraat 3, Deventer, the location of a former synagogue and Jewish school.

== See also ==
- List of Holocaust diarists
- List of posthumous publications of Holocaust victims
- Helga Deen – wrote a diary in 's-Hertogenbosch concentration camp (Camp Vught)
- List of Dutch Jews
- List of diarists
