= Adam Grünewald =

SS officer

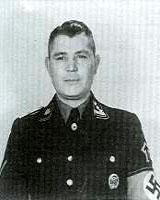
- Born: 20 October 1902; Frickenhausen am Main, German Empire
- Died: 22 January 1945 (aged 42); Budapest, Hungary
- Cause of death: Killed in action
- Occupation: Commandant of Herzogenbusch concentration camp (1943-1944)
- Status: Deceased
- Motive: Nazism
- Conviction: Manslaughter (10 counts)
- Penalty: 3.5 years imprisonment; commuted to service in a penal battalion
- SS career
- Allegiance: Germany
- Branch: Schutzstaffel
- Service years: 1934–1945
- Rank: SS-Sturmbannführer

Adam Grünewald (20 October 1902 – 22 January 1945) was a German Schutzstaffel officer and Nazi concentration camp commandant.

The son of a carpenter who died when he was 8, Grünewald apprenticed as a baker but found work difficult to come by when the First World War ended and the demobilised soldiers entered the labour market. Attracted to the nationalist propaganda prevalent at the time, Grünewald joined the Freikorps before signing on with the Reichswehr for a 12-year stint. Leaving the army as an Unterfeldwebel in April 1931, Grünewald again struggled to find employment and so joined the Sturmabteilung (SA), the Nazi paramilitary organization. He rose to the rank of SA-Obersturmbannführer in the SA before switching to the SS shortly after the Night of the Long Knives.

Prior to the outbreak of the Second World War, Grünewald was the commander of the detention centre in Dachau and an administrative officer in the SS-Totenkopfverbände. At the beginning of the war, he was transferred to the 3rd SS Panzer Division Totenkopf, where he commanded the bakery company. He was later promoted to be head of the division's procurement service. He served with the Totenkopf Division from November 1939 to October 1942. Grünewald then served as commander of the Oranienburg detention centre until June 1943.

In 1943, Grünewald succeeded Karl Chmielewski as commandant of Herzogenbusch concentration camp (aka Kamp Vught). However, like his predecessor he was also removed. He was found guilty of excessive cruelty to prisoners by an SS court for his role in the Bunker Tragedy in January 1944. Grünewald was investigated by SS judge Georg Konrad Morgen. Oswald Pohl, the head administrator of the Nazi concentration camp system, told Morgen not to bother with a trial, saying the lives of the women were meaningless in comparison to the many German women who had died in Allied bombing raids. However, Morgen proceeded with his investigation, which Pohl unsuccessfully attempted to block. Part of the reason Morgen was allowed to continue the investigation was that the incident was linked to the Dutch public. The regime figured that punishing Grünewald would most likely soften public anger over the incident.

Before the court reached its verdict, it decided to define the limits of "disciplinary authority" of camp commanders. "In the case the situation required it", camp commandants were authorized to carry out punishments that "may significantly harm physical well-being." Under those circumstances, such punishments were legal and "can never be punished as abuse." However, in Grünewald's case, they said he went too far.

"The disciplinary measures led to the health damage that exceeded the legalized scope. A detention of a big number of prisoners in one cell with extraction of possibility to seat and sleep might still be seen as a measure that is necessary under certain circumstances. However, if the punished prisoner is not physically able to take the punishment without suffering a significant health damage then it exceeds the permitted measure."

Grünewald was found guilty of 10 counts of manslaughter and sentenced to 3.5 years in prison. He was spared a harsher sentence on the grounds of his military service and the court accepting his claim that he "didn't wish for the death of ten women." The court found that Grünewald's crimes "did not come in the slightest out of dishonorable motives."

In March 1944, after serving nearly a month in prison, Grünewald was pardoned, but stripped of his rank and ordered to fight on the Eastern Front as a common soldier. He finished the war with the 3rd SS Division Totenkopf and died during a German counteroffensive in the siege of Budapest. His final rank was SS-Sturmbannführer.
