= Bunker Tragedy =

WWII Nazi concentration camp atrocity

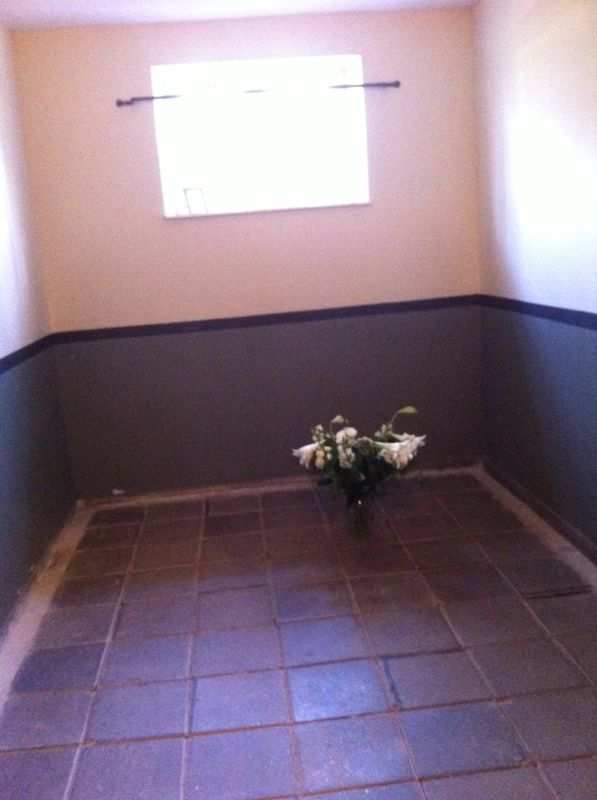
Replica of cell 115

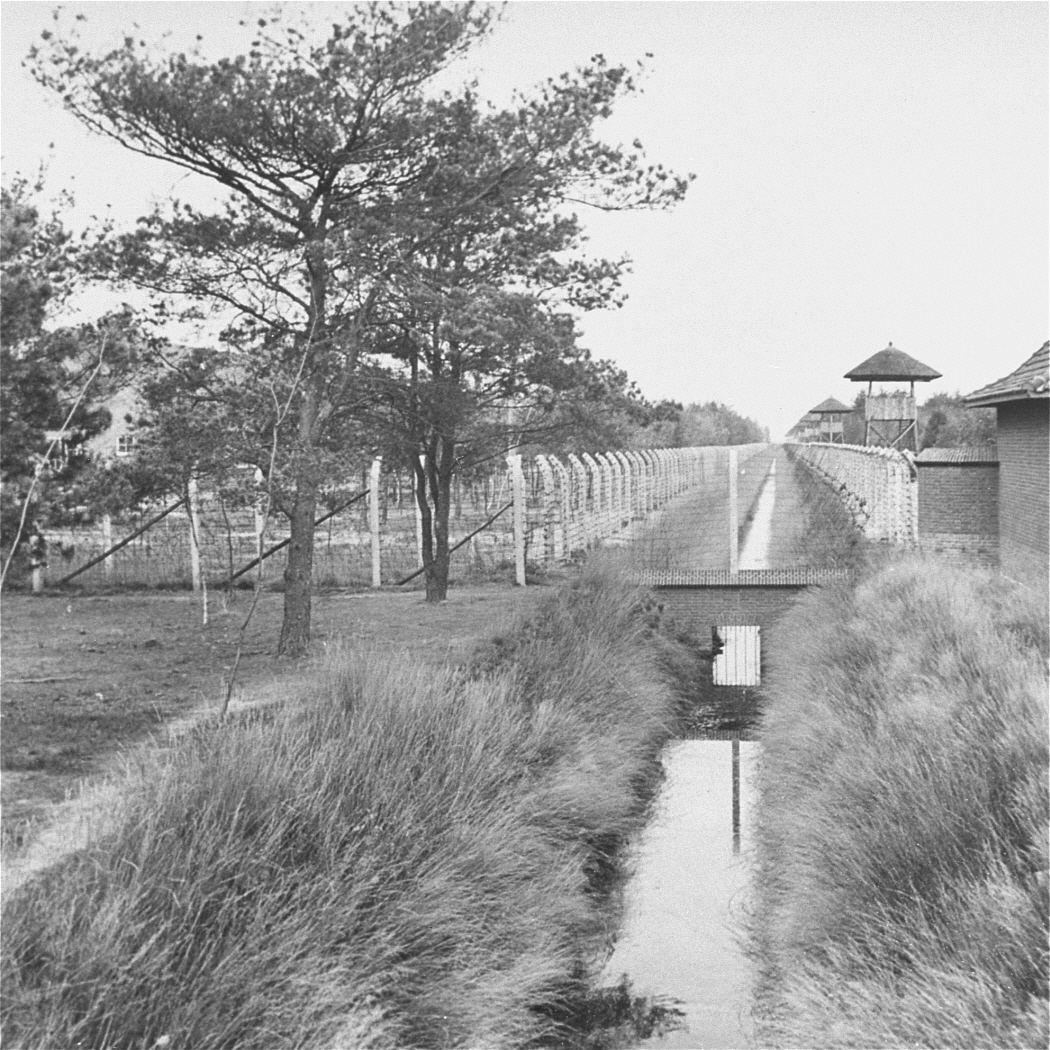
Kamp Vught, site of the Bunker Tragedy

The Bunker Tragedy was an atrocity in January 1944 during World War II that resulted in the death of ten prisoners, an act committed by the staff at the Herzogenbusch concentration camp (also known as Kamp Vught) in the Netherlands. The camp was operated by the SS Main Economic and Administrative Office. The ten victims were among 749 men, women and children who ultimately died at the camp.

== Events ==
In January 1944, a German woman who had been sent to Kamp Vught for insulting Hitler, sought to have her sentence cut short by reporting on other prisoners. When the other prisoners found out about the betrayal, one of the inmates retaliated against her by cutting off a hair braid. The inmate who retaliated against the German was reported to the commandant, who had her placed in a bunker. The other inmates staged a protest, with 91 signing a letter criticizing the action. On January 15, as suggested by Hermann Wicklein, the camp commandant Adam Grünewald had a total of 74 women confined into cell 115, which covered 9 square metres (97 sq ft) and had inadequate ventilation; another 17 of the protesting inmates were placed in a separate cell in the bunker. Kept in the cramped cell for 14 hours, ten of the women died after suffocating, only to be discovered after the cell was opened the next morning.

The Nazi occupying power reacted after details of the incident spread outside the camp and was written about in resistance newspapers. Commandant Grünewald and Wicklein were both court-martialed for excessive cruelty and were convicted of manslaughter and sentenced to serve time in prison. Grünewald was sentenced to 3.5 years and Wicklein was sentenced to six months, though both were granted pardons after serving a month in prison. Grünewald was then demoted and ordered to fight on the Eastern front, where he was killed in combat in January 1945.

Tineke Wibaut, a member of the Dutch resistance who had been imprisoned after aiding Jews escape the Nazis, was one of the 74 women in bunker 115. She wrote:

"When the lights went off, a great panic rose among the women. It was a strange swelling sound, which sometimes would diminish, but soon swell up again. It was caused by praying, screaming and yelling women. Some tried to yell over it to calm the women down, so they could save oxygen. Sometimes it would help a bit, but then it would start again. It would not stop, it continued the whole night. It diminished, though, because the heat was suffocating."

Suze Arts, a guard at the camp who rounded up the women that were crammed into the bunker, was dismissed from her position at the camp. After the war, she was put on trial for her role in the incident and sentenced to 15 years in prison.

This event is being remembered annually in closed circle.

== See also ==
- Black Hole of Calcutta
- Nazi concentration camps
