= Leib Langfus =

Polish rabbi

Leib Langfus, or also Leyb Langfus, was one of the victims of Auschwitz-Birkenau. A rabbi and Dayan (rabbinical judge) in Maków Mazowiecki, he was deported to Auschwitz-Birkenau in 1942, where he was forced to work as a Sonderkommando. After the war, a diary Langfus kept was unearthed in the grounds of Birkenau, which was published with several other diaries, under the title, The scrolls of Auschwitz. Between 1945 and 1980, a total of eight caches of documents were found buried in the grounds of Crematoria II and III in Auschwitz-Birkenau. The accounts written by Langfus are considered one of the most important historical documents dealing with subject of the Sonderkommando in Auschwitz, and the Holocaust in general.

== Biography ==
Leib Langfus was born in Warsaw and studied in the Tzusmir Yeshiva. After marrying the daughter of Dayan Shmuel Yosef Rosental of Maków Mazowiecki (in the mid-1930s), he assumed his father-in-law's post following the latter's death. He eventually became the town's Rabbi, known as "Der Makover Dayan."

In November 1942, the Jews of Makow-Mazowiecki were deported to Mlawa, and, from there, in early December, to Auschwitz. Langfus, his wife and one son were among the group - his wife and son were gassed immediately upon arrival.

Forced into the Sonderkommando, Langfus was required to prepare women's hair for shipment to Germany. While his faith in God remained unshakable during his time at Auschwitz-Birkenau (he considered his fate and that of his fellow Jews to be God's judgment), he was an active member of the Sonderkommando underground that eventually blew up one of the crematoria in Birkenau.

According to fellow prisoner Zalman Levental (whose diary was found in 1962), Langfus was one of the underground activists and planners of the revolt in the crematoria. It is believed he was executed on November 27, 1944.

== Post-war discovery ==
After the war, a number of manuscripts were found, describing the deportation from Makow as well as the work of the Sonderkommando in Auschwitz-Birkenau from 1943 to November 26, 1944. Eventually, historian Bernard Ber Mark (and his wife, after his death) - identified the works as being authored by Leib Langfus. (One of the abbreviations - AJRA- was determined to stand for Aryeh Yehuda (his Hebrew first names) Regel Arucha (Long Foot)- which is the translation of the Yiddish/German "Langfus").

== From The Diary ==
1. In his account of the deportation from Makow-Mazowiecki, Langfus senses the fateful severing of contacts with the world at large: "They are so lonely in the middle of the planet earth which belongs to everyone, everyone except them, the Jews."
2. He tells the story of the rabbi's wife from Strapivka who arrived at Auschwitz from Koszo, Hungary, in May 1944; while waiting in the stripping room she asked God to forgive the Belz Rebbe who had reassured Hungarian Jews concerning their fate, while he himself had fled to Palestine.
3. "It occurred in late winter 1943, upon the arrival of a transport of children from the Shavli ghetto following the so-called Children's Aktion there on November 5. When the Sonderkommando man approached a child to undress him, his sister tried to stop him, shouting: "Let go, you Jewish murderer! Don't lay your hands stained by Jewish blood on my beautiful brother .... " Another child cried: "But you are a Jew! How can you lead dear Jewish children to be gassed so that your life may be spared! Is your life in the company of murderers more worthy than the lives of so many Jewish victims?"
4. Elsewhere he describes yet another moving scene, this time not involving Sonderkommando men. Boyaner Rebbe Moshe Friedman, who arrived at Auschwitz during Passover of 1944, approached the Oberscharfuhrer on duty and told him to his face that the Germans would not succeed in their plot to murder the Jewish people, and that they would pay tenfold for each Jewish soul they murdered. Afterward the rabbi, together with the whole group, recited the prayer Shema Israel and went to his death. The author comments: "This spiritually exalted moment, without a precedent in human life, validates the eternal spiritual steadfastness of Judaism."
5. In a chapter titled "Di 600 Yinglekh" (The 600 Youngsters), he describes the horrifying spectacle of 600 children being pushed savagely and cruelly to their death in the gas chamber. Some pleaded with the Sonderkommando prisoners to save them. Others appealed to the SS men who instead of replying shoved them even more forcefully into the bunker. The screams and sobbing of the children were deafening until death silenced them, at which moment an expression of satisfaction slipped over the faces of their tormentors. Langfus concludes his account with a question: "Have they never had any children?"
6. On another occasion he describes a group of Polish and Jewish prisoners being led to the slaughter. A Polish girl left the group and asked the Sonderkommando prisoners to tell her people that she and her comrades had died a hero's death. The Poles sang their national anthem, while the Jews sang Hatikva. "A terrible and cruel fate has ordained that the lyrical sounds of these different anthems mingle in this accursed corner of the globe."
7. In one incident he relates the story of Jews from Tarnów who waited passively for their execution, some reciting Vidui (the Jewish confessional prayer) before dying. Suddenly, a young man jumped up on the bench, and began shouting that it was not possible they were going to die, that such a terrible thing could not happen in this world. Mesmerized, the victims listened to his speech, but within minutes all of them, including the speaker, were led to their deaths.
8. His last entry reads: "Now we are being taken into the zone. The last 170 remaining of us. We are certain we are going to meet our death. 30 people have been selected to stay in Crematorium Number V. Today is November 26, 1944".

Langfus also appears in the biography of fellow Sonderkommando, Filip Müller, who describes Langfus and his fellow prisoners' last moments. Stepping out of line to rebuke the SS officers for lying to them about their fate, Langfus addressed his fellow doomed prisoners:

"We should be alone, without a family, without relatives, without friends, without a place we might call our own, condemned to roam the world aimlessly. For us there would be neither peace nor rest of mind, until one day we would die in some corner, lonely and forsaken. Therefore, brothers, let us now go to meet death bravely and with dignity!"
