= Trotz alledem =

Trotz alledem is German for "in spite of all that" (i.e. despite the specific things under discussion; contrast the more general trotz allem, meaning "in spite of everything"). It can refer to:

- Trotz alledem, a German version of the Burns song A Man's A Man for A' That which was popular during the 1848 revolutions
- Karl Liebknecht - Trotz alledem!, the second film in the Karl Liebknecht series
- Trotz Alledem, an Erwin Piscator revue production and pioneering work of documentary theatre

== See also ==
- Trotz Allem, a German youth club
