= Henryk Tauber =

Holocaust survivor (1917–2000)

Henryk (Tauber) Fuchsbrunner (8 July 1917 – 3 January 2000) was a Polish Jewish prisoner at Auschwitz-Birkenau death camp during the Holocaust, who gave detailed testimony at the end of World War II. Tauber was his mother's maiden name. His parents were married by a rabbi and never filed for a civil licence due to quotas on the number of Jewish marriages in Galicia then under Austrian rule. Henryk's father's name was Abraham Fuchsbrunner and Fuchsbrunner was the name by which he was known. Henryk Fuchsbrunner shortened his name to Henry Fuchs after he arrived in the United States in 1952.

Fuchsbrunner was one of five children. He lived with his extended family in Chrzanów in south Poland before the outbreak of war.

After several deportations, Tauber arrived at the Kraków Ghetto. After avoiding capture by the Germans for over 3 years, he was arrested in November 1942 and sent to the Auschwitz concentration camp. Shortly after arriving at Auschwitz, he was selected for work in the Sonderkommando at the crematoria of the camp, where his specialized job of stoking the ovens with corpses probably ensured his survival.

== Sonderkommando at Auschwitz ==
The Sonderkommando were almost always Jewish prisoners, selected because of their health and age, to work within the crematoria at Auschwitz-Birkenau. They were separated from other prisoners and put to work in one of the 5 crematoria that existed between January 1943 and January 1945, when the marches westward - a.k.a. the death marches - began. Their work included dragging the dead prisoners from the gas chambers to the ovens within the crematoria after the poisonous Zyklon B gas had been administered by the Nazi chemists, placing the corpses on rollers to be put into the ovens, sorting the bodies according to size and fat content to maximize the efficiency of the ovens, and properly stoking the ovens for burning the dead.

The work was gruesome and many Sonderkommando did not make it past their first day. So as not to alarm or inform the rest of the inmates about what transpired within the crematoria, once a prisoner was marked as a Sonderkommando, he was barred from leaving the crematoria and lived within, never allowed to mix with the other Auschwitz-Birkenau prisoners. Each crematorium was manned by members of the SS, rather than by Ukrainian or Wehrmacht. The typical Sonderkommando survived only few months, dying either from illness or from having virtually their entire "generation" of sonderkommando exterminated in the gas chambers and their bodies burnt in the ovens.

== Fuchsbrunner's participation in the Crematoria Uprising ==
Fuchsbrunner participated in the Crematoria Uprising of 1944, during which 3 of 23 SS soldiers were killed and a further 12 were wounded. Another source (Dragon) testified that Fuchsbrunner participated in the killing of no less than 5 SS guards stationed at Crematoria II before the uprising was put down. Fuchsbrunner later was given an assignment outside the crematoria, before being returned to his position as a stoker in Crematoria IV in late October 1944. He escaped again 3 months later in January 1945, that time successfully.

== Escape ==
When the camp began to be evacuated by death marches in January 1945, Fuchsbrunner escaped near Pszczyna. Fuchsbrunner is believed to have been among the longest known surviving member of the Sonderkommando, having been forced to join in January 1943.

Fuchsbrunner's escape in January 1945 is written about in Gideon Greif's book, We Wept Without Tears. Fuchsbrunner and two other Sonderkommando inmates, brothers Shlomo and Abraham Dragon, escaped during a death march, subsequently commandeering a farmhouse and taking 2 prisoners, until their escape was made possible into the Russian zone.

On 24 May 1945, Fuchsbruner gave evidence at a Polish judicial enquiry in Auschwitz under Judge Jan Sehn. He was the only witness to give a precise and detailed description of the equipment and workings of the crematoria and gas chambers at Auschwitz-Birkenau. Pressac describes Fuchsbrunner's testimony as "head and shoulders" above any other given on the workings of the death camps and 95% accurate. In his May 1945 testimony, Fuchsbrunner was one of the first to mention the now infamous "Angel of Death" Josef Mengele in his descriptions of the mass killings and administration of Zyklon B in the Auschwitz crematoria.

His testimony, as well as that he survived for so long in the Sonderkommando - nearly 2 years, when the typical lifespan of a Sonderkommando was about 3 months - is considered exceptional. Fuchs' is described by Pressac in his book Auschwitz: Technique and Operation of the Gas Chambers as a modest man who shied away from the limelight and who gave testimony as objectively as possible, even on the brink of what the human mind could handle.

After the war, Fuchsbrunner was able to free his brother, Bendit Fuchsbrunner, from the Soviet Union, where he had been held since his escape to Russia from Poland during the first days of the German invasion in 1939. For seven years after war ended, the two brothers lived in Munich, where they opened a leather business, Die Brüder Fuchsbrunner Leder Herstellung. In 1952, after selling the business, they arrived in the United States on the Liberté, a French-flagged ship.

Fuchsbrunner died on 3 January 2000 at the age of 82. He was survived by his wife and three children.
