= A Damaged Mirror =

2014 "novelized" memoir by Yael Shahar and Ovadya ben Malka

A Damaged Mirror: A story of memory and redemption
- Author: Yael Shahar & Ovadya ben Malka
- Language: English
- Genre: Memoir
- Published: 2014 (Kasva Press, United States, Israel)
- Publication place: United States
- Media type: Print (hardback & paperback)
- Pages: 406
- ISBN: 978-0991058440

A Damaged Mirror is a 2014 "novelized" memoir by Yael Shahar and Ovadya ben Malka. The book explores the moral dilemmas of a former member of the Birkenau Sonderkommando, Ovadya ben Malka. It was reissued in 2015 with a new foreword by Rabbi Nathan Lopes Cardozo.

== Plot summary ==
The book opens with Yael reaching out to a rabbi for a rabbinic judgement for "Alex". In subsequent correspondence with the rabbi, Rav Ish-Shalom, we learn that Alex's real name is Ovadya. He was deported to Birkenau from his home in Salonika, Greece at the age of 17. His mother and sister were murdered in the gas chambers on arrival, and Ovadya was sent to the Sonderkommando, the group of prisoners forced to burn the bodies of the Nazis' victims.

Ovadya wants the rabbi to serve as a rabbinic judge—essentially to put himself on trial for what he did in Birkenau. "The fact that good people can be forced to do wrong doesn't make them less good," he says. "But it also doesn't make the wrong less wrong." However, he is unable to speak of what he did to survive, and his past is gradually revealed in a series of letters to the rabbi and to Masha, a woman who was forced into prostitution during the war. He is able to tell her what he cannot speak aloud.

Yael, born two decades later in America, has no connection with Ovadya, and yet she haunted by a mysterious memory of something she could not have lived. In an attempt to understand the source of these memories, she sets out on a quest to Europe and eventually Israel. Her quest to learn what and how she remembers is bound up with Ovadya's search for forgiveness and atonement. She too is unable to speak of the harrowing glimpses revealed by memory, but Ovadya holds the key to fitting the pieces together.

The second half of the book follows Ovadya in his spiritual quest, under the guidance of Rav Ish-Shalom. The rabbi sets him the task of bearing witness for those who were murdered in the gas chambers, but, scarred by the memory, Ovadya is reluctant to tell what he saw. Little by little, his memory returns, and he finds that he had suppressed even the good memories of his childhood in Salonika. Eventually, a breakthrough occurs and he is able to do what is required by Jewish Law—to journey back to Birkenau and make a formal confession to the souls of those he feels that he has wronged.

== Backstory ==
On July 7, 2010, B'Sod Siach, an online Hebrew-language newsletter, carried a write-up of a viddui—a ritual confession—from beyond the grave. A group of twenty young graduates from a teachers’ college in England had served as witnesses to the last will and testament of Ovadya ben Malka, one of the prisoners forced to operate the machinery of death. This episode, as told from the author's point of view, forms a key chapter of A Damaged Mirror.
