= Gustav Landauer Library Witten =

- Gustav-Landauer-Bibliothek Witten
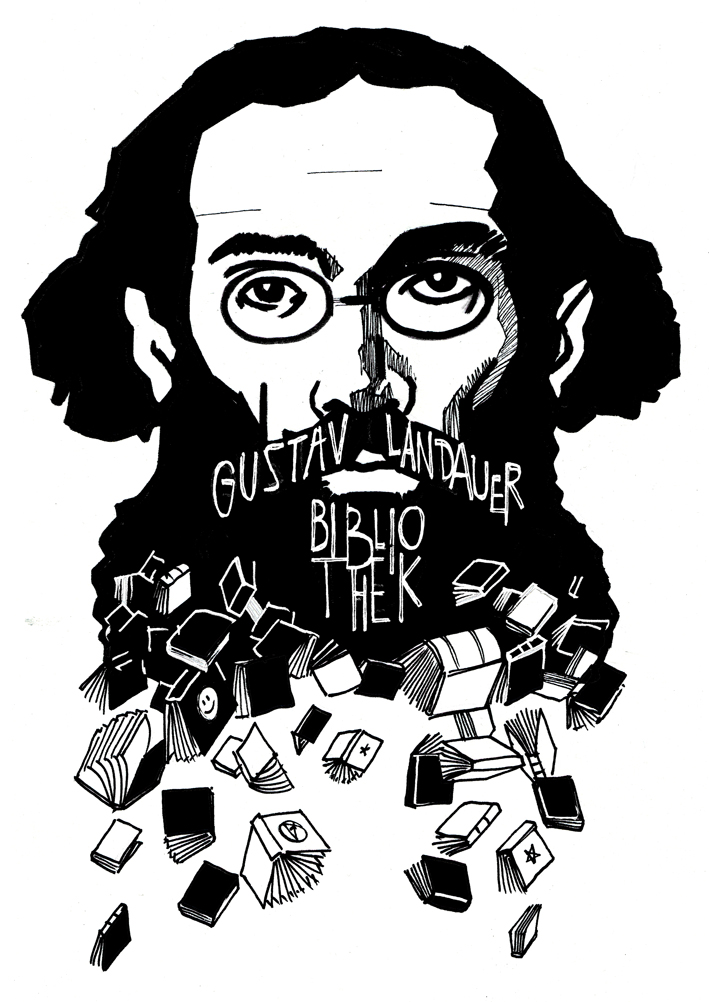
- logo of Gustav Landauer Library Witten

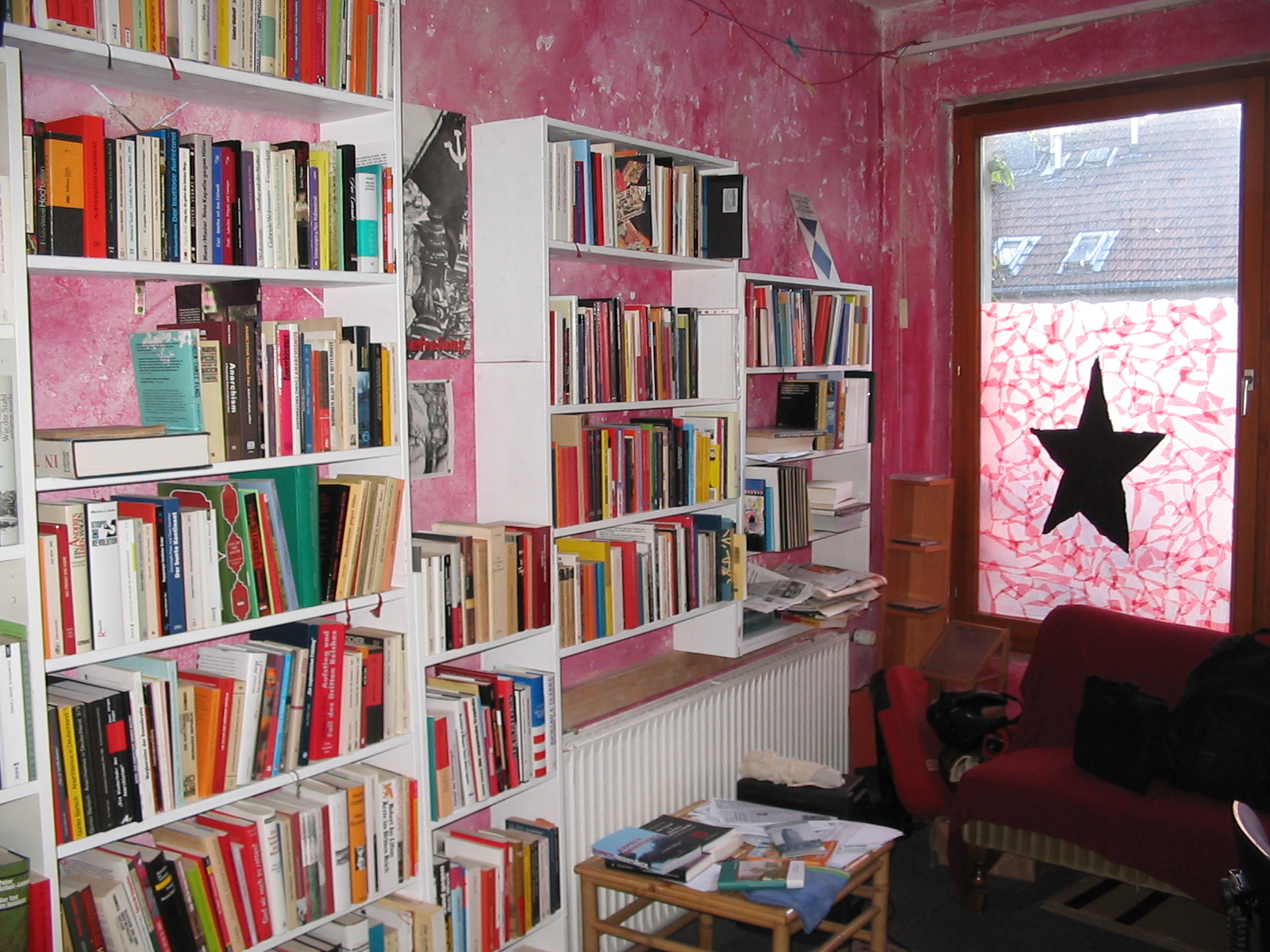
- Gustav Landauer Library Witten
- 51.44312°N 7.33213°E
- Location: Witten, Germany
- Type: Special library
- Established: 2011

Other information
- Website: projekte.free.de/glb/

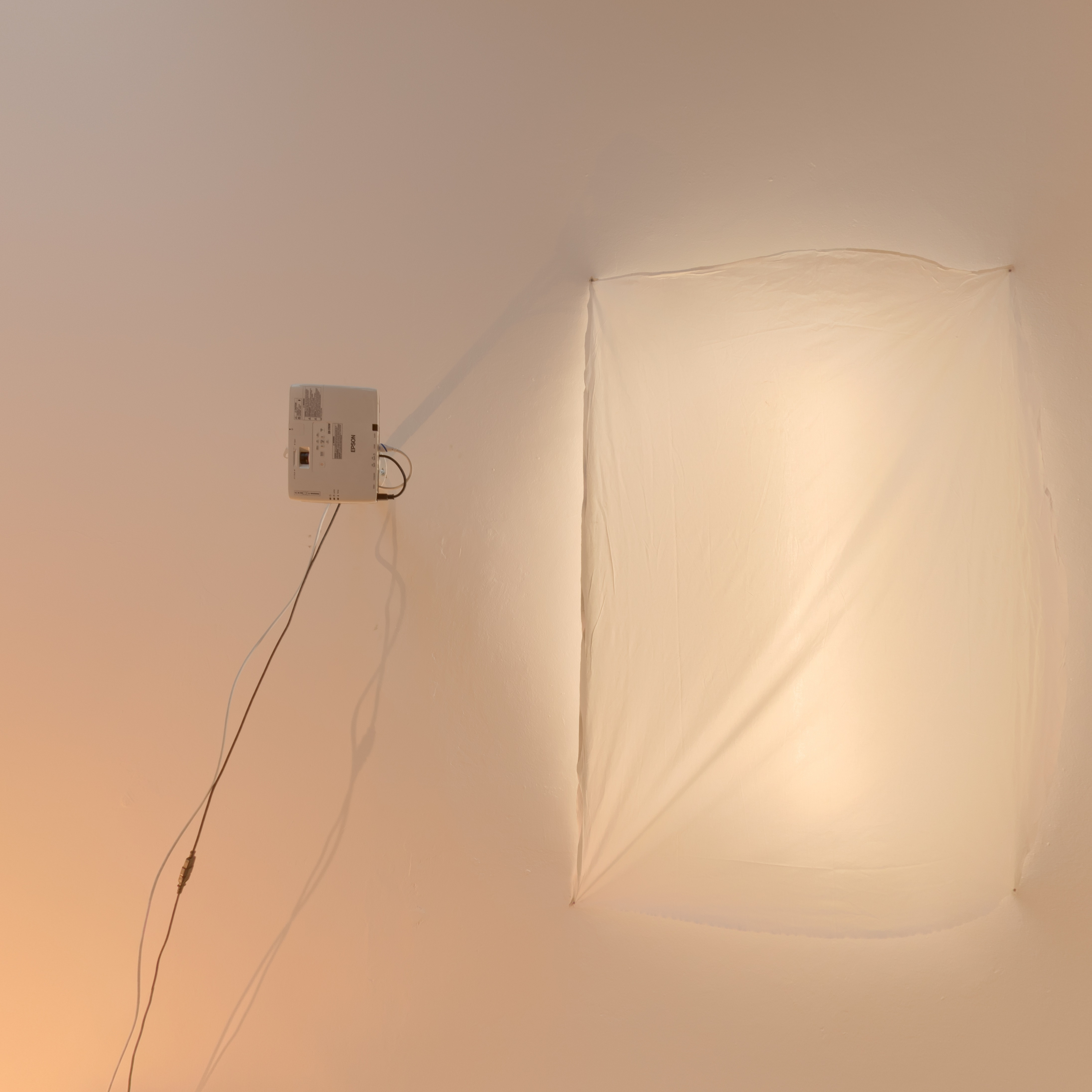
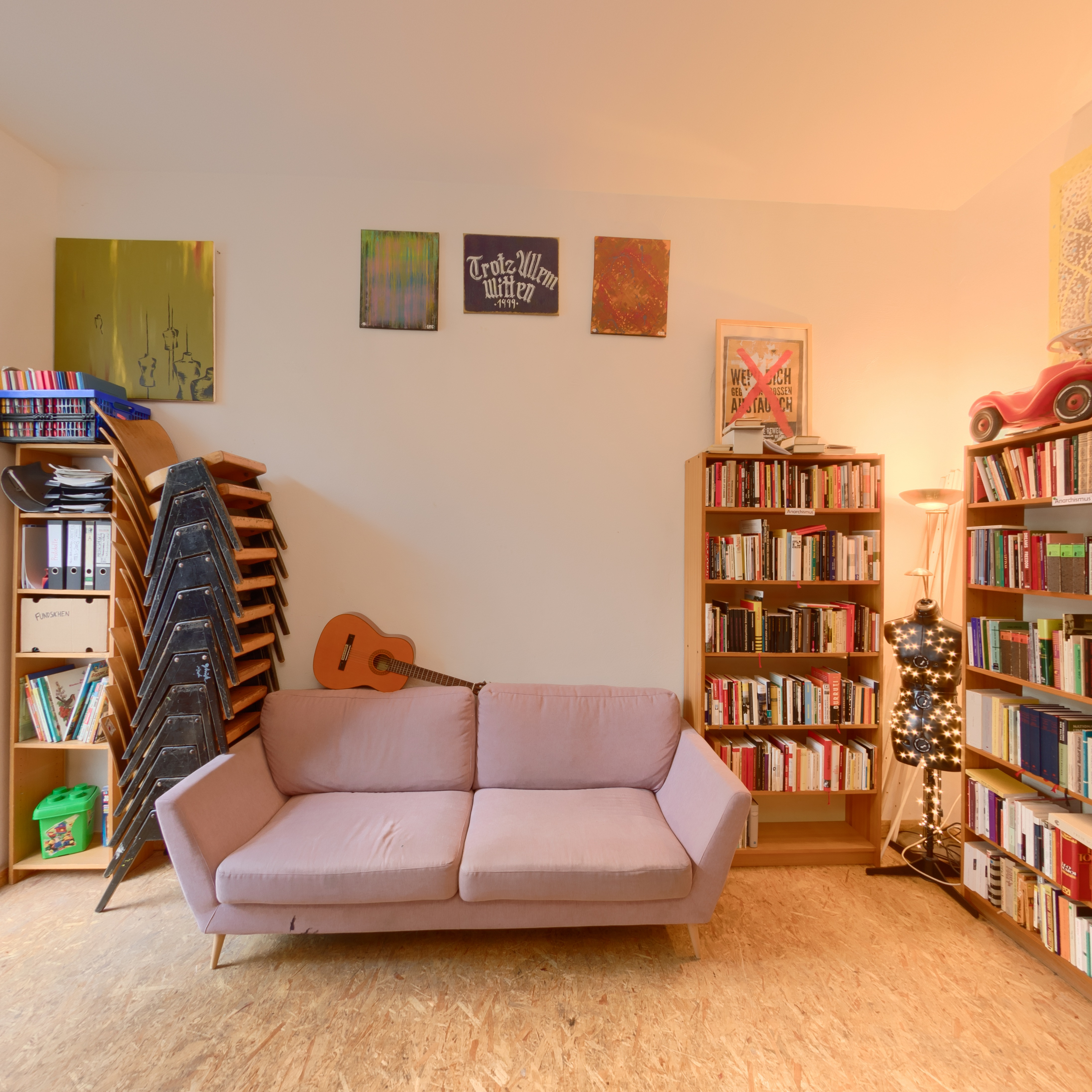
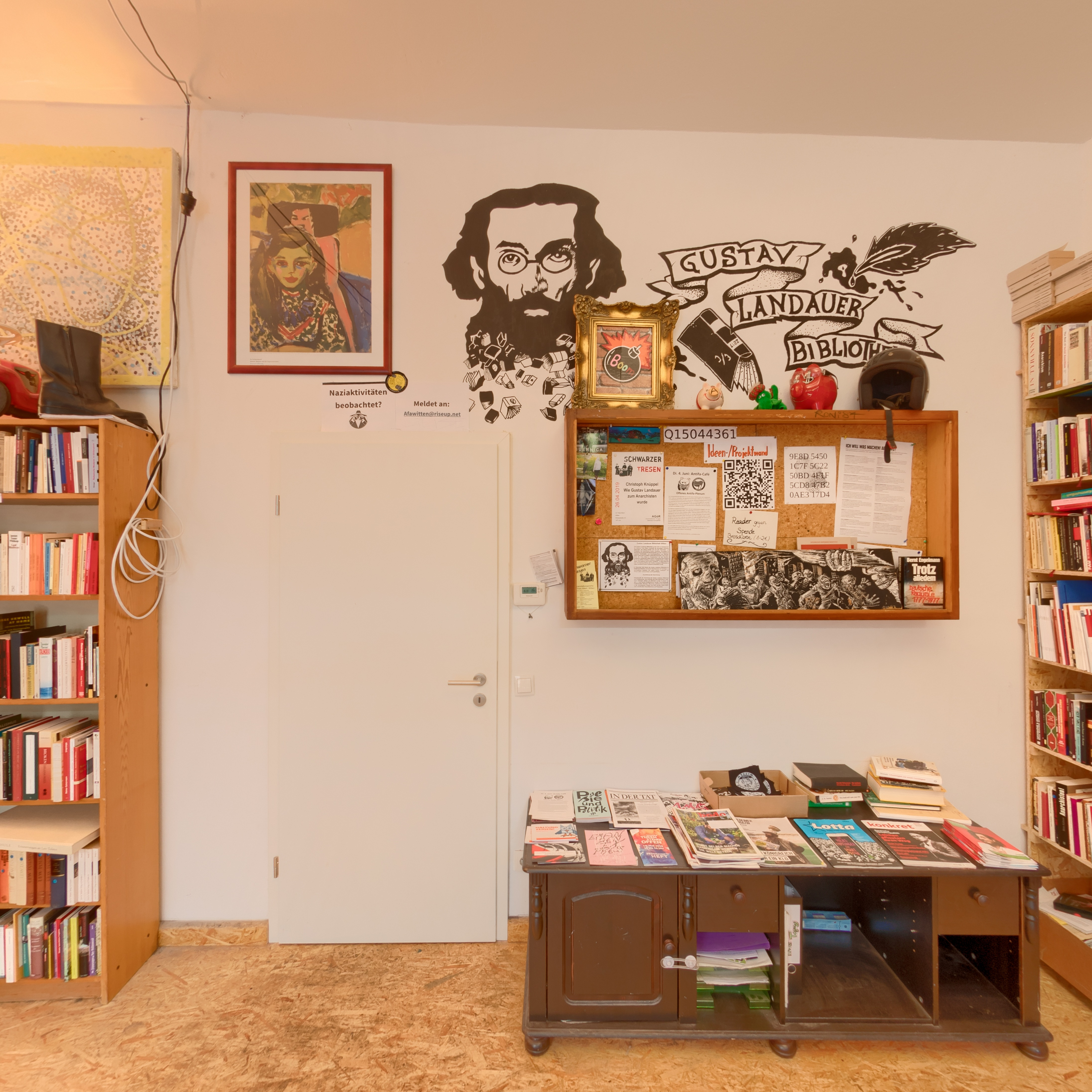
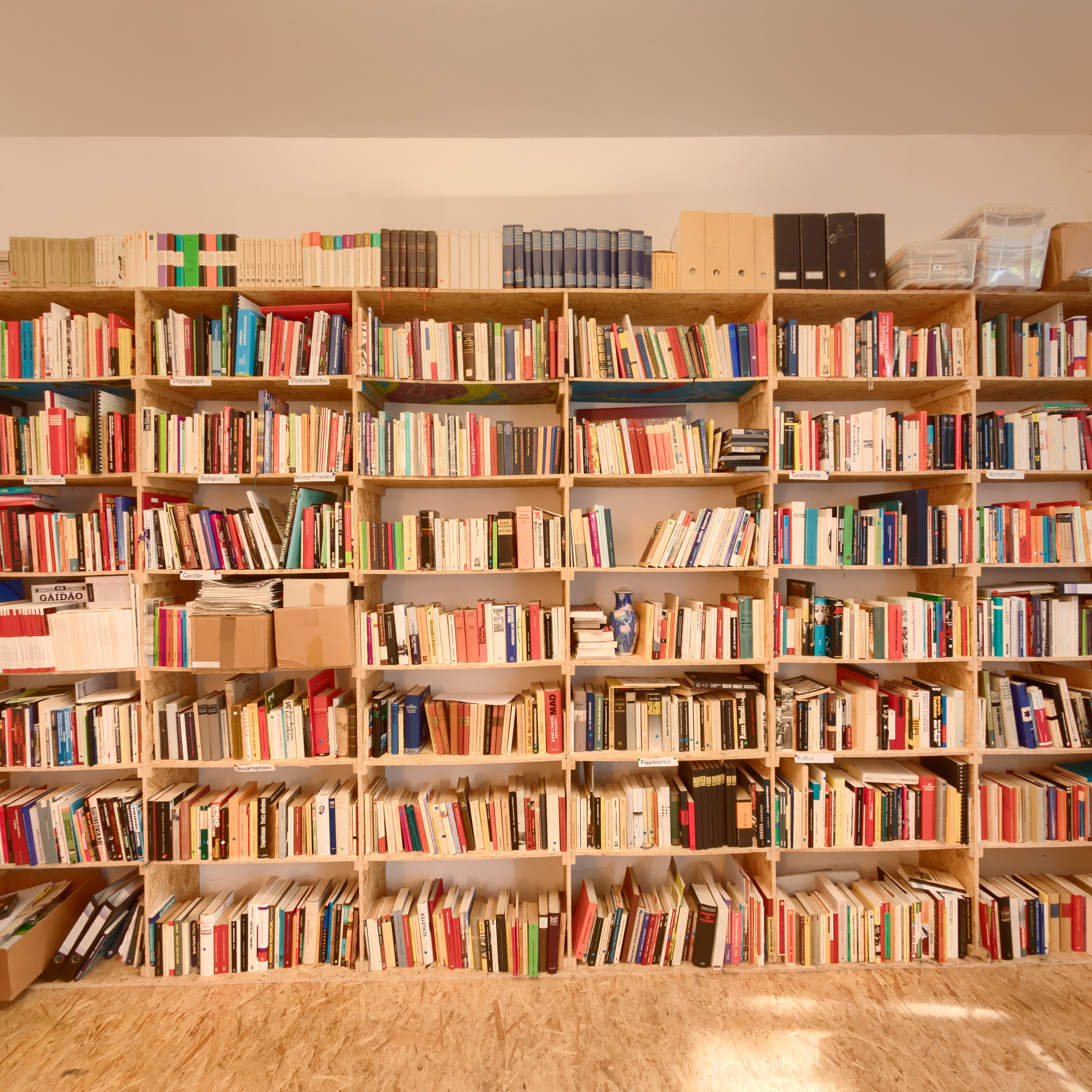
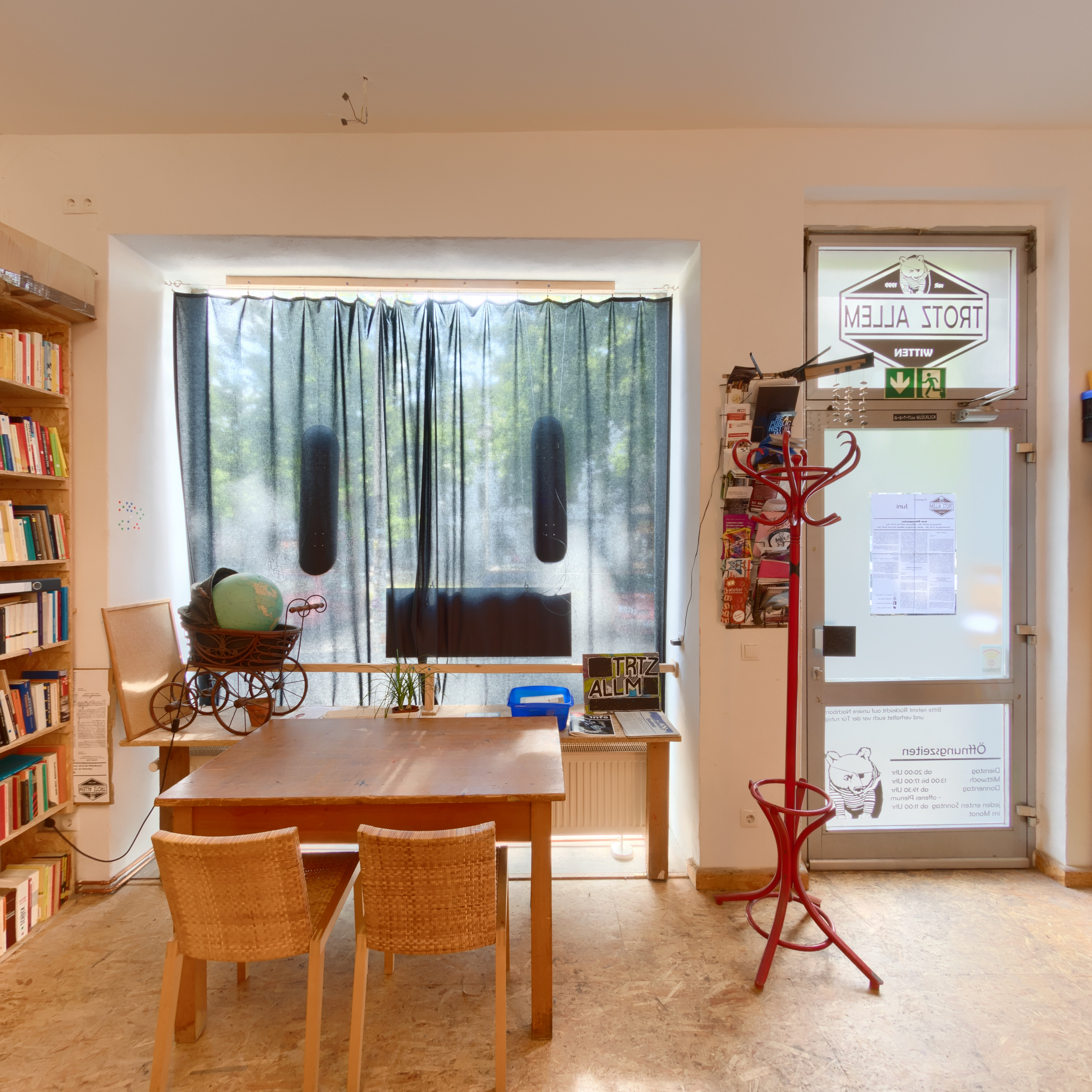
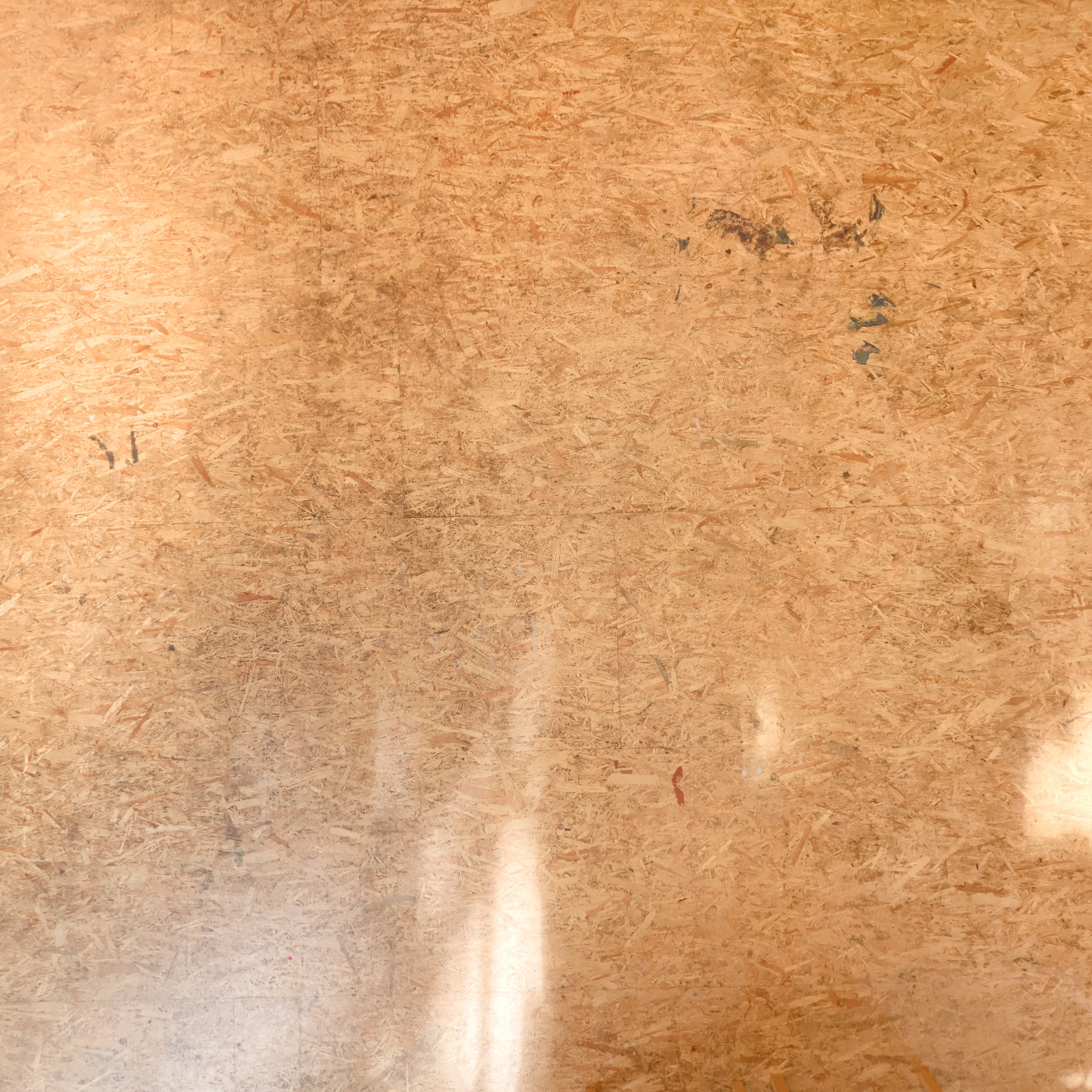
360° panorama of Gustav Landauer Library Witten

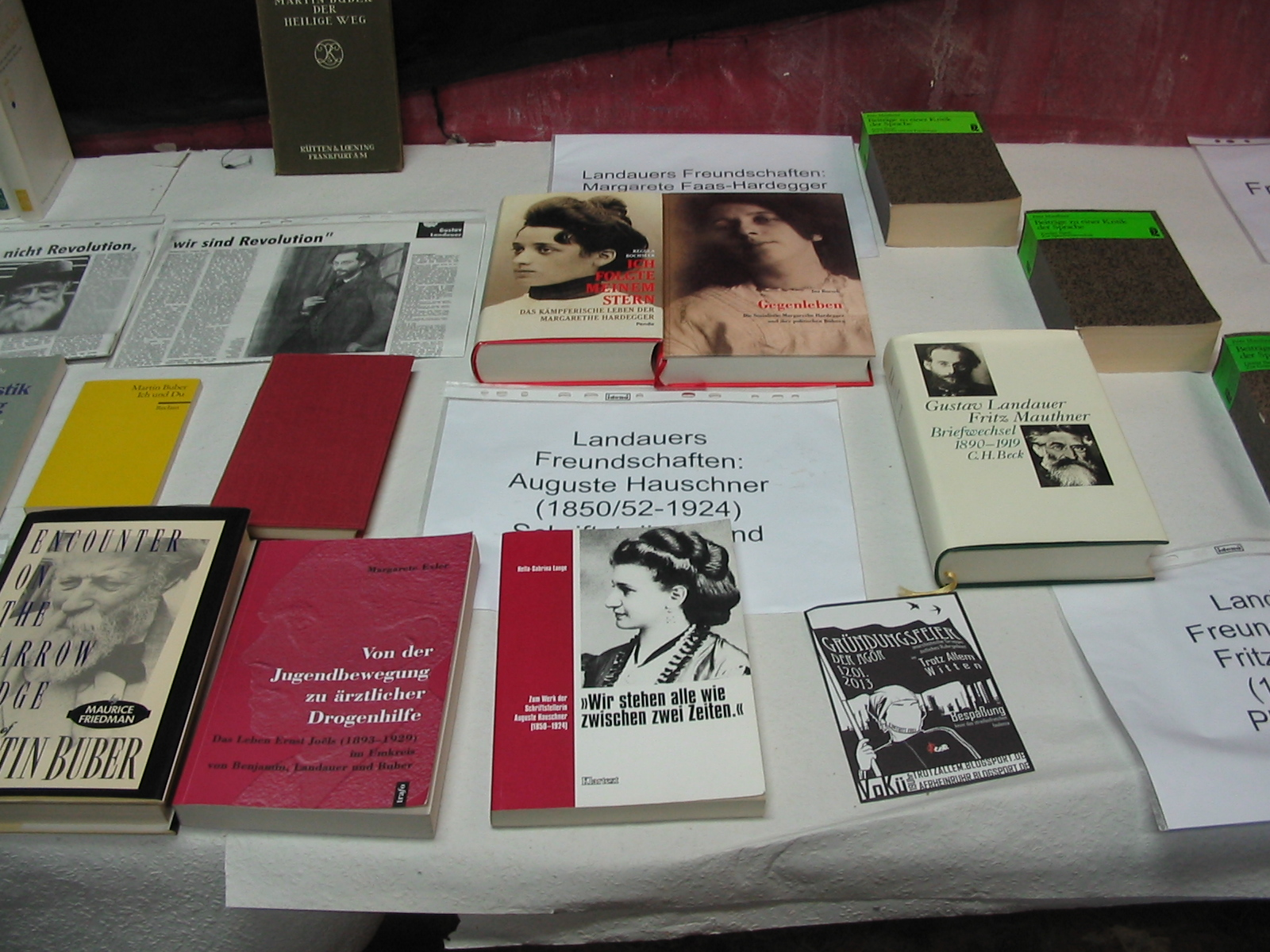
Gustav Landauer Book Exposition

The Gustav Landauer Library Witten (German: Gustav-Landauer-Bibliothek Witten, GLBW) is a special library in Witten, Germany.

== History ==
The Gustav Landauer Library was founded 2011 in sociocultural center Trotz Allem (Despite it all) inside of the then infoshop. The name relates to the theorist of anarchism Gustav Landauer. Foundation of the collection was a big book donation on occasion of the 100th anniversary of the death of the Russian writer and anarcho-pacifist Leo Tolstoy in 2010. Further book donations followed. In 2012 Trotz Allem together with Deutsch-Israelische Gesellschaft Witten (German-Israeli Society Witten) organized a lecture by the editor of Ausgewählte Schriften (elected writings) of Landauer, Siegbert Wolf, about philosophy and judaism at Gustav Landauer. In the context of this event a book exposition by Gustav Landauer Library about the life and work of Gustav Landauer was presented.

== Scope of collection ==
The collection of Gustav Landauer Library is focused at publications, that were distributed, read and discussed in the left-wing-alternative movements. Among other subjects it includes the topics antifascism, gender, free pedagogy, peace politics, ecology, economy, political developments in the diverse countries of the world and the teachings of classic and current theorists.
