= Filip Müller =

Holocaust survivor

- Born: 3 January 1922; Sereď, Czechoslovakia
- Died: 9 November 2013 (aged 91); Mannheim, Baden-Württemberg, Germany
- Known for: being a Sonderkommando at Auschwitz during the Holocaust

Filip Müller (3 January 1922 – 9 November 2013) was a Jewish Slovak Holocaust survivor and a member of the Sonderkommando at Auschwitz, the largest Nazi German concentration camp during World War II, where he witnessed the murders of tens of thousands of people.

== Auschwitz ==
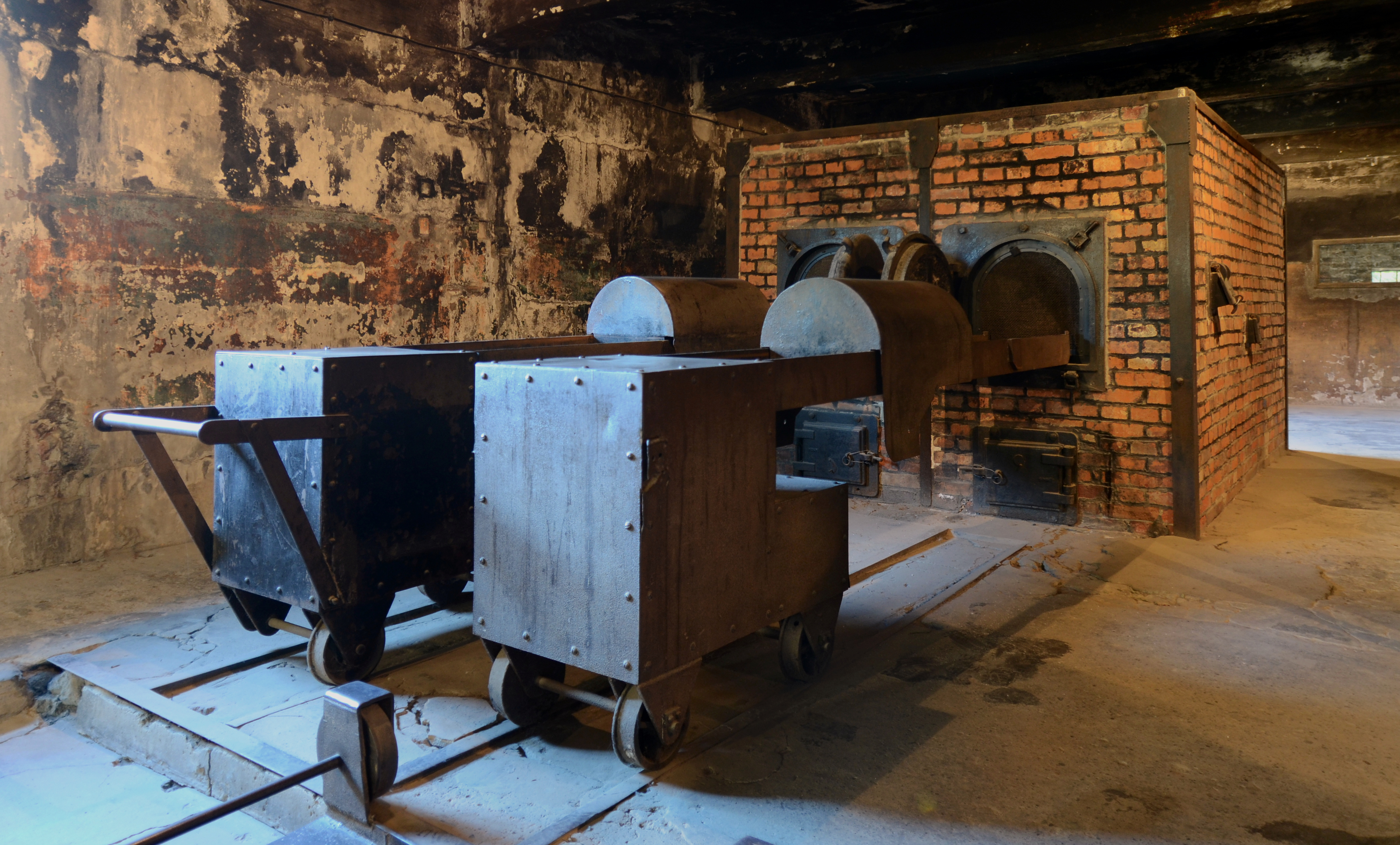
Crematorium at Auschwitz I

Müller was born in Sereď in the Czechoslovak Republic. In April 1942, he was sent on one of the earliest Holocaust transports to Auschwitz II, where he was given prisoner number 29236. Müller was assigned to the Sonderkommando that worked on the construction of crematoria and the installation of the gas chambers.

Once the crematoria were completed, Müller was assigned to a Sonderkommando unit tasked with operating the killing facilities; his performing this role, he believed, was the only reason the Germans kept him alive. Müller's unit would meet new arrivals of men, women, and children at the undressing area just outside the gas chambers, in the basement of the crematoria. He testified he would tell the terrified new arrivals that they were somewhere safe. Once the SS had given the command, the naked victims would be herded into the gas chambers, where they were gassed with hydrogen cyanide (Zyklon B).

After the victims had been murdered, Müller's unit was tasked with the removal of the bodies and grouping them by size and fatty tissue to facilitate their disposal in the crematoria. The victims' clothes were collected and disinfected, and all valuables were to be surrendered to the SS – some of which the Sonderkommando would pocket for bartering purposes. He describes the gassing and cremating of a previous Sonderkommando in December 1942.

He stated that, in the summer of 1942, he was transferred from the Sonderkommando of Crematorium One, where he spent six weeks, to Monowitz. The Monowitz Subcamp, seven kilometres (4.3 mi) from the main Auschwitz site, was a labor camp run by the German firm IG Farben, and there were no crematoria there. For the remainder of his imprisonment at Auschwitz, Müller worked mainly at Birkenau, where the main crematoria were located.

He remained at Auschwitz until January 1945, when the camp was evacuated before the arrival of the Red Army. After a death march into Germany, he was liberated from the Mauthausen subcamp of Gunskirchen in May 1945.

=== Suicide attempt testimony ===
Sonderkommando units were periodically murdered to eradicate witnesses, but Müller managed to survive in Auschwitz for over two years. Müller reports that he decided to end his life by joining a group of the first liquidation of the Theresienstadt family camp inside the gas chambers. While awaiting his fate, he testified that a girl who recognized him came up to him, stating,

We understand that you have chosen to die with us of your own free will, and we have come to tell you that we think your decision is pointless: for it helps no one [...] We must die, but you still have a chance to save your life. You have to return to the camp and tell everybody about our last hours. You have to explain to them that they must free themselves from any illusions. They ought to fight, that's better than dying here helplessly. It'll be easier for them, since they have no children. As for you, perhaps you'll survive this terrible tragedy and then you must tell everybody what happened to you.

Müller says he came to believe that he had a duty to stay alive so that he could join other survivors and become a living witness to the horrors of the Holocaust. This was called 'perhaps the most poignant story of any Holocaust testimony' by Yehuda Bauer, a distinguished Holocaust scholar.

=== Testimony ===
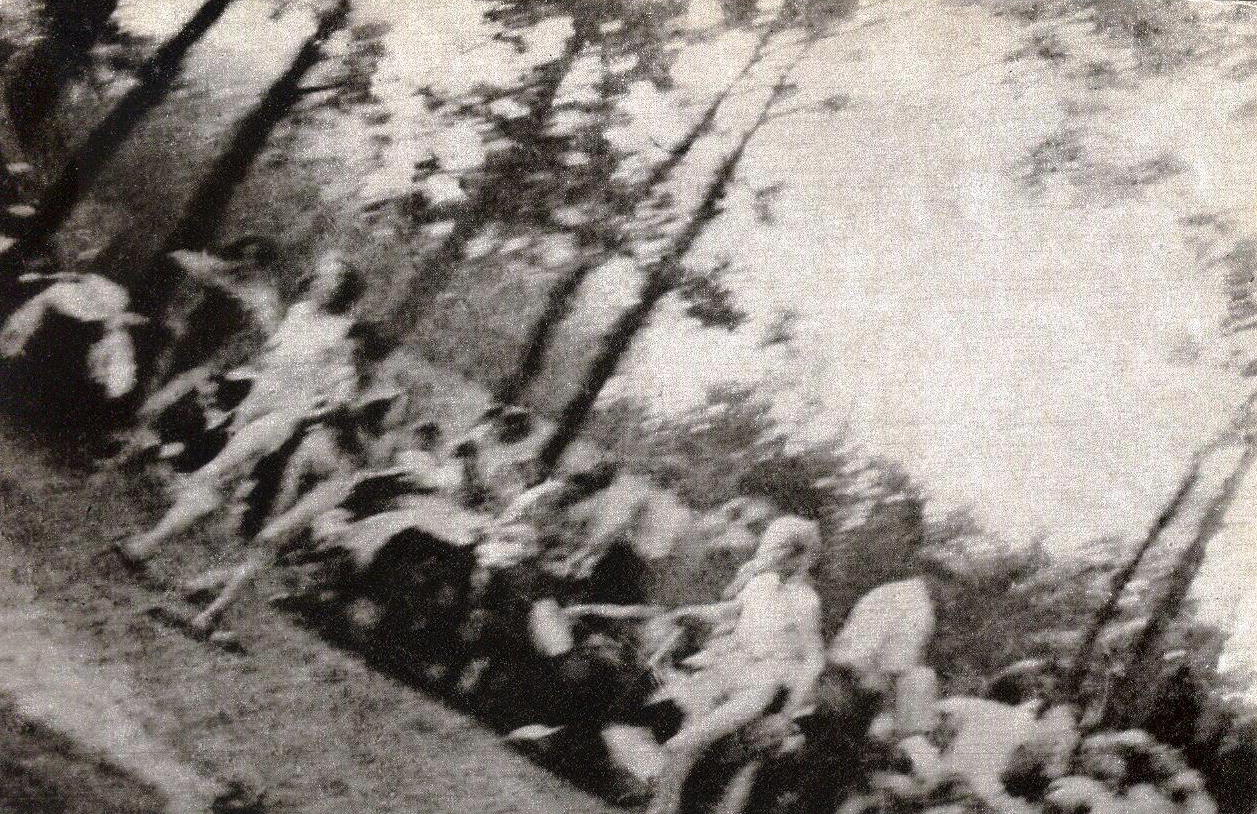
One of the four Sonderkommando photographs taken at Auschwitz

Müller first testified during his hospital recovery. His statement was originally published in an obscure Czech collection, but it was reprinted in the 1966 book The Death Factory, written by two other Holocaust survivors, Erich Kulka and Ota Kraus. Müller testified at the second Frankfurt Auschwitz trials in 1964.

Müller sought out a "literary collaborator" in order to write a second version of his testimony. That work was published in 1979 with the title Auschwitz Inferno: The Testimony of a Sonderkommando, or in the US Eyewitness Auschwitz: three years in the Gas Chambers.

Müller also testified in the 1985 film Shoah by Claude Lanzmann.

== Death ==
After 1969, Müller lived in the West. He died in Mannheim, Baden-Wurttemberg on 9 November 2013, at the age of 91.

== See also ==
- Henryk Mandelbaum – Polish Sonderkommando survivor of Auschwitz
- André Rogerie – French resistance leader, survivor of seven concentration camps, and postwar trial witness
