= Shlomo Venezia =

Greek-born Italian Jew survivor of the Auschwitz-Birkenau concentration camp

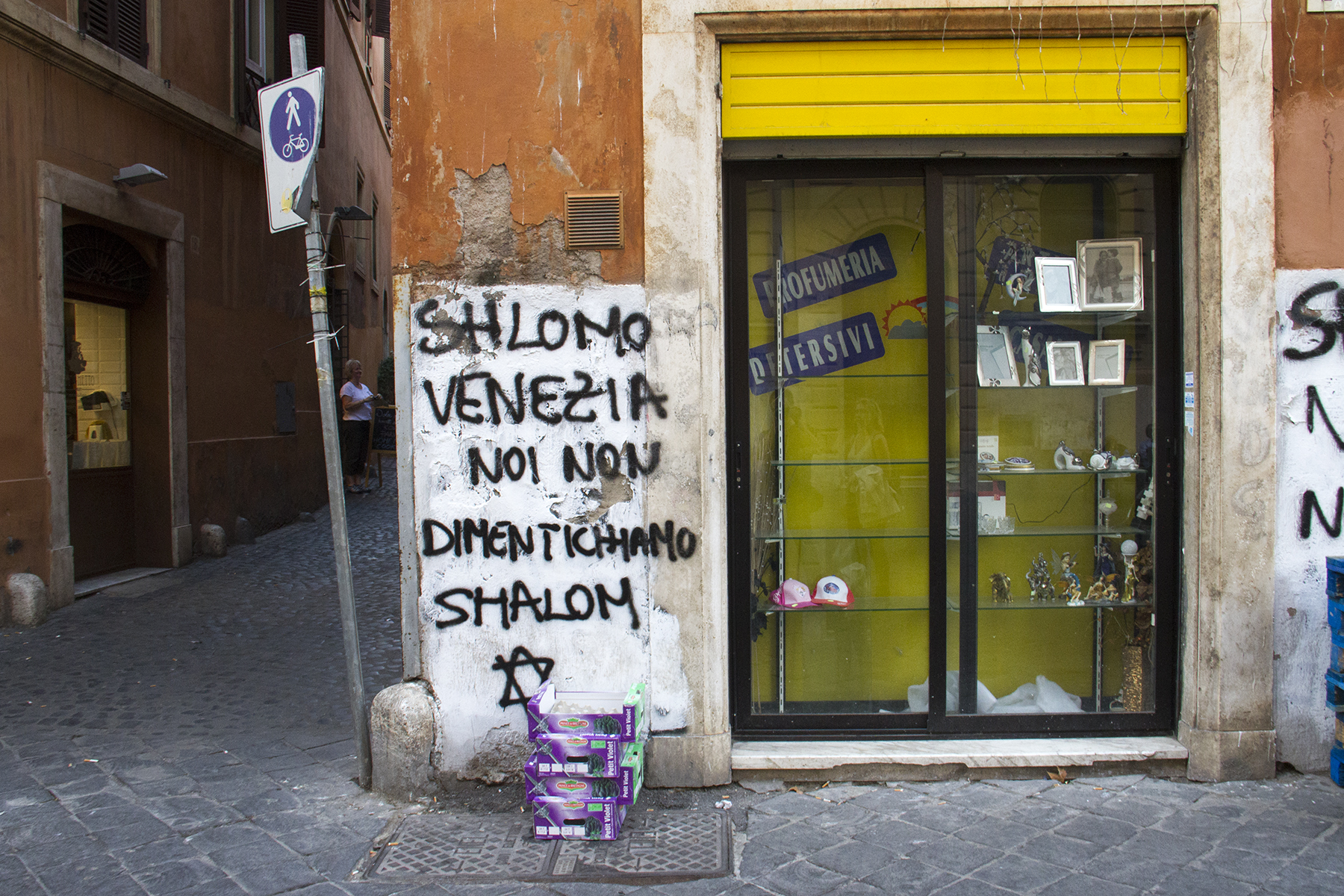
A message on a wall near Porticus Octaviae, in Rome: "Shlomo Venezia, we don't forget, Shalom"

Shlomo Venezia (Greek: Σλόμο Βενέτσια; 29 December 1923 – 1 October 2012) was a Greek-born Italian Jew. He was a survivor of the Auschwitz-Birkenau concentration camp.

== Biography ==
Venezia was born in Thessaloniki, where he was arrested with his family in March 1944; they were deported to the extermination camp at Auschwitz-Birkenau, one of the three main camps that made up the Auschwitz complex. During the selection made by Nazi doctors to separate deportees deemed fit to work from those "useless", who were immediately sent to the gas chambers, Venezia was saved along with his brother Maurice (Morris) and two cousins. During his imprisonment he was forced to work in the Sonderkommando ("special units"), teams of inmates that dealt with disposal and cremation of the prisoners killed in gas chambers. The members of these teams were killed to keep the secret about the conduct of the Final Solution (the systematic extermination of the Jewish people).

Venezia was one of the very few who survived the Sonderkommando corvées, and the only Italian among them; he published his recollections in a memoir published by Rizzoli in October 2007, Sonderkommando Auschwitz. He died, aged 88, in Rome.

== Experiences in Auschwitz ==
Venezia was subjected to the typical procedure of the deported to Auschwitz: shaving, showering, being tattooed with a number on the left forearm, and wearing the interned uniform. At the end of the procedure, Venezia was locked up in a separate and isolated section of the camp in quarantine, which—according to the German authorities in the camp—would have prevented the spread of epidemics inside the camp. After only 20 days of 'quarantine,' Venezia was assigned to the Sonderkommando of one of the large crematoria in Birkenau, made mainly of young and strong prisoners in good physical condition, because of the physical effort that the job required.

Venezia was one of the few first-hand survivors of the 1944 revolt of the Sonderkommando. He describes the actual events and the days leading up to the revolt.

Venezia was part of the Sonderkommando for six months. In Auschwitz-Birkenau, Venezia's mother and his two sisters were killed. After the liberation, Venezia became one of the most important spokesmen for the tragedy of the Holocaust. As a guest on television, in schools, and at memorial events for the Holocaust, he turned his interest to young people as future spokespersons of the immense tragedy that struck Europe between 1940 and 1945. His experiences led Roberto Benigni to use him as a consultant, together with Marcello Pezzetti, for the film Life is Beautiful.

Shlomo features throughout Auschwitz - The Final Witness, a 2001 NY Festival winning film made by Sky for Channel 5, which reunited him with his Sonderkommando brother and cousin as they revisited the death camp together for the first time in over 50 years.

== Bibliography ==
- Shlomo Venezia. Sonderkommando Auschwitz. Penguin Books, 2007. ISBN 88-17-01778-7

== See also ==
- Sonderkommando
- Morris Venezia
- Dario Gabbai
- History of the Jews in Thessaloniki
