= Sonderkommando =

Work units of Nazi death camp prisoners

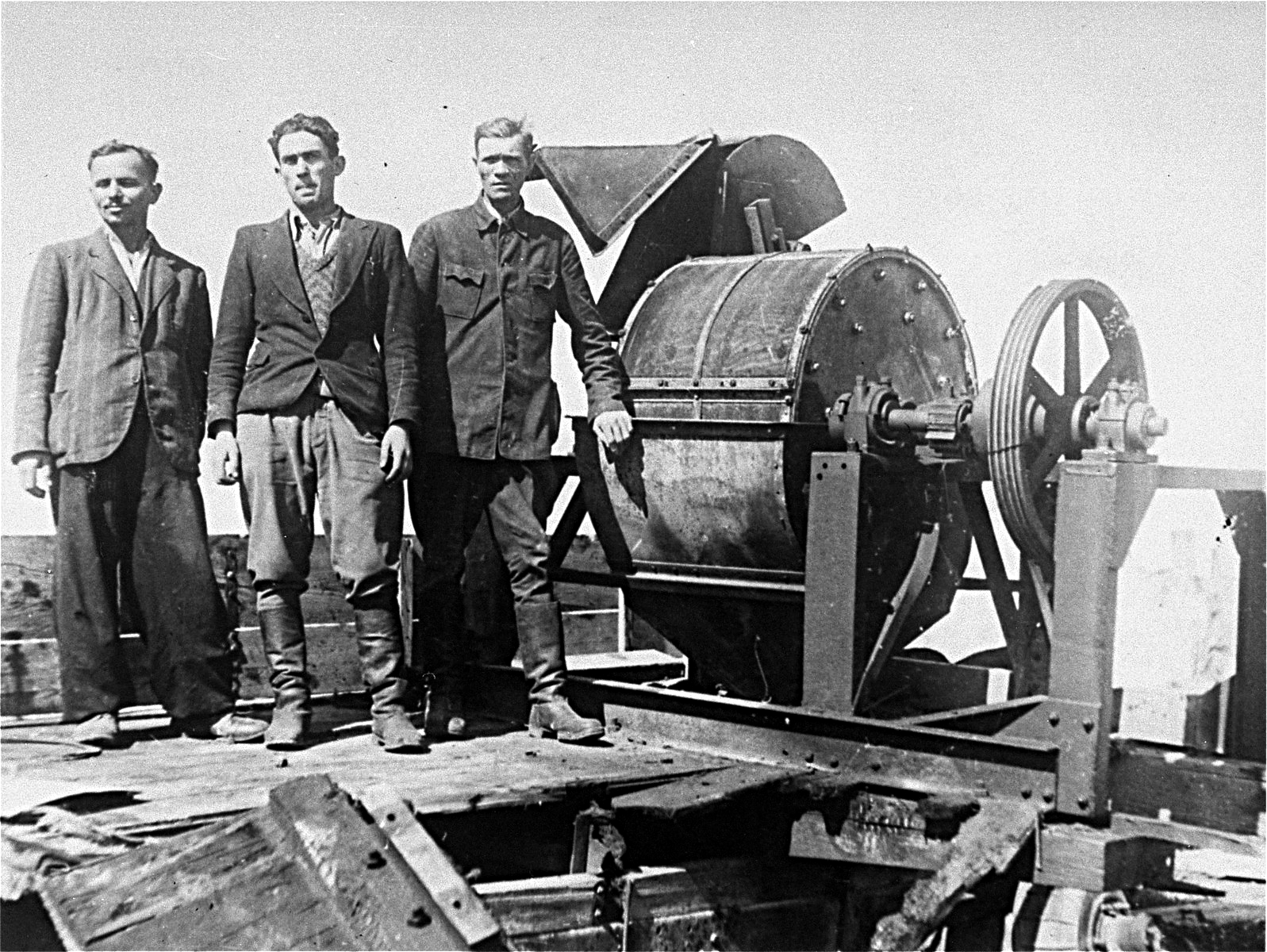
- Survivors of Sonderkommando 1005 posing next to a bone-crushing machine at the site of the Janowska concentration camp. Photograph taken following the liberation of the camp.
- Location: German-occupied Europe
- Date: 1942–1945
- Incident type: Removal of Holocaust evidence
- Perpetrators: Schutzstaffel (SS)
- Participants: Arbeitsjuden
- Camp: Extermination camps including Auschwitz, Belzec, Chełmno, Majdanek, Sobibór and Treblinka among others
- Survivors: Filip Müller, Henryk Tauber, Morris Venezia, Henryk Mandelbaum, Dario Gabbai, Antonio Boldrin

Sonderkommandos (German: [ˈzɔndɐkɔˌmando], lit. 'special unit') were work units made up of German Nazi death camp prisoners. They were composed of prisoners, usually Jews, who were forced, on threat of their own deaths, to aid with the disposal of gas chamber victims during the Holocaust. The death-camp Sonderkommandos, who were always inmates, were unrelated to the SS-Sonderkommandos, which were ad hoc units formed from members of various SS offices between 1938 and 1945.

The German term was part of the vague and euphemistic language which the Nazis used to refer to aspects of the Final Solution (e.g., Einsatzkommando, "deployment units").

== Death factory workers ==
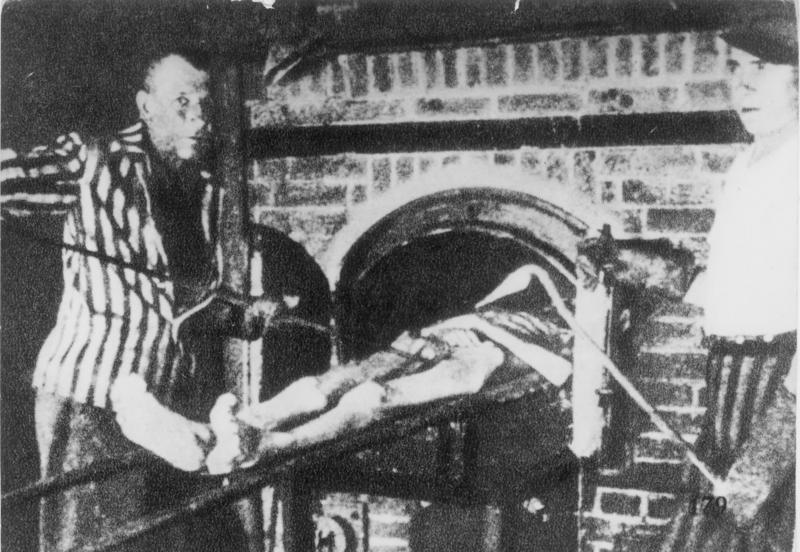
Crematorium at Dachau, May 1945 (photo taken after liberation)

Sonderkommando members did not participate directly in killing; that responsibility was reserved for the SS, while the Sonderkommandos' primary duty was disposing of the corpses. In most cases, they were inducted immediately upon arrival at the camp and forced into the position under threat of death. They were not given any advance notice of the tasks they would have to perform. To their horror, sometimes the Sonderkommando inductees would discover members of their own family amid the bodies. They had no way to refuse or resign other than by killing themselves. In some places and environments, the Sonderkommandos might be euphemistically called Arbeitsjuden (Jews for work). At other times, Sonderkommandos were called Hilflinge (helpers). At Birkenau the Sonderkommandos numbered up to 400 people by 1943 and, when Hungarian Jews were deported there in 1944, their numbers swelled to more than 900 persons, in order to keep up with the increased rounds of murder and extermination.

Because the Germans needed the Sonderkommandos to remain physically able, they were granted much less squalid living conditions than other inmates: they slept in their own barracks and were allowed to keep and use various goods such as food, medicines and cigarettes brought into camp by those who were sent to the gas chambers. Unlike ordinary inmates, they were not normally subject to arbitrary killing by guards. Their livelihood and utility were determined by how efficiently they could keep the Nazi death factory running. As a result, Sonderkommando members survived longer in the death camps than other prisoners – but few survived the war.

As they had detailed knowledge of the Nazis' practice of mass murder, the Sonderkommando were considered Geheimnisträger – bearers of secrets. As such, they were held in isolation away from prisoners being used as slave labor (see SS Main Economic and Administrative Office). There was a belief that every three months, according to SS policy, almost all the Sonderkommandos working in the death camps' killing areas would be gassed themselves and replaced with new arrivals to ensure secrecy, and that some inmates survived for up to a year or more because they possessed specialist skills. Usually, the task of a new Sonderkommando unit would be to dispose of the bodies of their predecessors. Research has calculated that from the creation of a death camp's first Sonderkommando to the liquidation of the camp, there were approximately 14 generations of Sonderkommando. However, according to historian Igor Bartosik, author of Witnesses from the Pit of Hell: History of the Auschwitz Sonderkommando (2022) published by the Auschwitz Museum, the renewed exterminations of the Auschwitz-Birkenau Sonderkommandos are a myth, since such an extermination only took place there once. "Nor was it true that prisoners were selected for their technical expertise. After a cursory inspection, they were selected merely in view of their apparent ability to work," wrote Bartosik.

=== Eyewitness testimony ===
Fewer than 20 of several thousand members of the Sonderkommandos are documented to have survived until liberation and to have testified about the events (although some sources claim more). Among them were Henryk (Tauber) Fuchsbrunner, Filip Müller, Daniel Behnnamias, Dario Gabbai, Morris Venezia, Shlomo Venezia, Antonio Boldrin, Alter Fajnzylberg, Samuel Willenberg, Abram Dragon, David Olère, Henryk Mandelbaum and Martin Gray. Another six or seven are confirmed to have survived, but did not give witness (or at least, such testimony is not documented). Buried and hidden accounts by members of the Sonderkommando were later found at some camps.

Between 1943 and 1944, some members of the Birkenau Sonderkommando were able to obtain writing materials and record some of their experiences and what they had witnessed. These documents were buried in the grounds of the crematoria and recovered after the war. Five men have been identified as the authors of these manuscripts: Zalman Gradowski, Zalman Lewental, and Leib Langfus, who wrote in Yiddish; Chaim Herman, who wrote in French; and Marcel Nadjary, who wrote in Greek. Of the five, only Nadjary survived until liberation; Gradowski was killed in the revolt at Crematorium IV on 7 October 1944 (see below), or in retaliation for it; Lewental, Langfus, and Herman are believed to have been killed in November 1944. Gradowski wrote the following note, found buried at an Auschwitz crematorium site:

Dear finder of these notes, I have one request of you, which is, in fact, the practical objective for my writing ... that my days of Hell, that my hopeless tomorrow will find a purpose in the future. I am transmitting only a part of what happened in the Birkenau-Auschwitz Hell. You will realize what reality looked like ... From all this you will have a picture of how our people perished.

The manuscripts are kept primarily in the archive of the Auschwitz-Birkenau State Memorial Museum. Exceptions are Herman's letter (kept in the archives of the Amicale des déportés d'Auschwitz-Birkenau) and Gradowski's texts, one of which is held in the Russian Museum of Military Medicine in St. Petersburg, and another in Yad Vashem, Israel. Some of the manuscripts were published as The Scrolls of Auschwitz, edited by Ber Mark. The Auschwitz Museum published some others as Amidst a Nightmare of Crime.

The Scrolls of Auschwitz have been recognised as some of the most important testimony to be written about the Holocaust, as they include contemporaneous eyewitness accounts of the workings of the gas chambers in Birkenau.

== Revolts ==
Sonderkommando prisoners participated in uprisings on two occasions.

=== Treblinka ===
The first revolt occurred at Treblinka on 2 August 1943. Prisoners used a duplicate key to open the camp arsenal and steal 20 to 25 rifles, 20 hand grenades, and several pistols. At 3:45 p.m., 700 Jews launched an attack on the camp's SS guards and trawnikis that lasted for 30 minutes. They set buildings and a fuel tanker ablaze. Armed Jews attacked the main gate, while others attempted to climb the fence. About 200 Jews escaped from the camp, (Note: Two hundred is the number accepted by Polish historians and the Treblinka camp museum; the Holocaust Encyclopedia lists 300, instead.) but the well-armed guards slaughtered hundreds of others. They phoned for SS reinforcements from four towns, and these set up roadblocks and pursued escapees in cars and on horses.

Partisans of the Armia Krajowa (Polish: Home Army) transported some of the surviving escaped prisoners across the Bug River, while others were helped and fed by Polish villagers. Of the 700 Sonderkommando who took part in the revolt, 100 managed to survive and escape from the camp, and around 70 of these are known to have survived the war. These include Richard Glazar, Chil Rajchman, Jankiel Wiernik, and Samuel Willenberg, who co-wrote the Treblinka Memoirs.

=== Auschwitz ===
In October 1944, the Sonderkommando rebelled at Crematorium IV in Auschwitz II. For months, young Jewish women workers had been smuggling small packets of gunpowder out of the Weichsel-Union-Metallwerke, a munitions factory in an industrial area between the main camp of Auschwitz I and Auschwitz II. The gunpowder was passed along a smuggling chain to Sonderkommando in Crematorium IV. The plan was to destroy the gas chambers and crematoria and launch an uprising.

However, on the morning of 7 October 1944, the camp resistance warned the Sonderkommando in Crematorium IV that they were to be killed, and the Sonderkommando attacked the SS and Kapos with two machine guns, axes, knives, and grenades, killing three and injuring about a dozen more. Some of the Sonderkommando escaped from the camp, but most were recaptured later the same day. Of those who did not die during the uprising itself, 200 were later forced to strip and lie face down before being shot in the back of the head. A total of 451 Sonderkommandos were killed that day.

== Media portrayals ==
The earliest portrayals of the Sonderkommando were generally unflattering. Miklos Nyiszli, in Auschwitz: A Doctor's Eyewitness Account, described the Sonderkommando as enjoying a virtual feast, complete with chandeliers and candlelight, as other prisoners died of starvation. Nyiszli, an admitted collaborator who assisted Josef Mengele in his medical experiments on Auschwitz prisoners, would appear to have been in a good position to observe the Sonderkommando in action, as he had an office in Krematorium II. But some of his inaccurate physical descriptions of the crematoria diminishes his credibility in this regard. Historian Gideon Greif characterized Nyiszli's writings as among the "myths and other wrong and defamatory accounts" of the Sonderkommando, which flourished in the absence of first-hand testimony by surviving Sonderkommando members.

Primo Levi, in The Drowned and the Saved, characterizes the Sonderkommando as being "akin to collaborators." He said that their testimonies should not be given much credence, since they had much to atone for and would naturally attempt to rehabilitate themselves at the expense of the truth. But, he asked his readers to refrain from condemnation: "Therefore I ask that we meditate upon the story of 'the crematorium ravens' with pity and rigor, but that judgment of them be suspended."

Filip Müller was one of the few Sonderkommando members who survived the war and was also unusual in that he served on the Sonderkommando far longer than most. He wrote of his experiences in his book Eyewitness Auschwitz: Three Years in the Gas Chambers (1979). Among other incidents he related, Müller recounted how he tried to enter the gas chamber to die with a group of his countrymen but was dissuaded from suicide by a girl who asked him to remain alive and bear witness.

Since the late 20th century, several other more sympathetic accounts of the Sonderkommando have been published, beginning with Gideon Greif's own book We Wept Without Tears (1999 in Hebrew, 2005 in English), which consists of interviews with former Sonderkommando members. Greif includes as his prologue Gunther Anders' poem "And What Would You Have Done?", which says that one who has not been in that situation has little right to judge the Sonderkommando: "Not you, not me! We were not put to that ordeal!"

The first depiction of the Sonderkommando revolt was titled Ikh leb (I live), a play written by Jewish author Moshe Pinchevski. It was also the first post-World War 2, Yiddish-language performance at the Idisher Kultur Farband Teater in Bucharest, Romania, in 1945.

A theatre play that explores the moral dilemmas of the Sonderkommando was The Grey Zone, directed by Doug Hughes and produced in New York at MCC Theater in 1996. The play was later adapted as a film of the same title by producer Tim Blake Nelson. The film took its mood, as well as much of its plot, from Nyiszli, portraying members of the Sonderkommando as crossing the line from victim to perpetrator. Sonderkommando Hoffman (played by David Arquette) beats a man to death in the undressing room under the eyes of a smiling SS member. Nelson emphasizes that the subject of the film is that very moral ambiguity. "We can see each one of ourselves in that situation, perhaps acting in that way, because we are human. But we're not sanctified victims."

A "novelized" memoir, A Damaged Mirror (2014), by Yael Shahar and Ovadya ben Malka, explores the lengths to which a former Sonderkommando will go to obtain forgiveness and closure: "The fact that good people can be forced to do wrong doesn't make them less good," the survivor says of himself, "but it also doesn't make the wrong less wrong."

Son of Saul, a 2015 Hungarian film directed by László Nemes, and winner of the 2015 Cannes Film Festival Grand Prix, details the story of one Sonderkommando attempting to bury a dead child he takes for his son. Géza Röhrig, who starred in the film, reacted with anger to the suggestion, made by a journalist, that members of the Sonderkommando were "half-victim, half-hangman".

"There has to be a clarification," he said. "They are 100% victims. They have not spilled blood or been involved in any sort of killing. They were inducted on arrival under the threat of death. They had no control of their destinies. They were as victimised as any other prisoners in Auschwitz."

== Gallery ==
Original photographs by "Alex" (Alberto Errera)
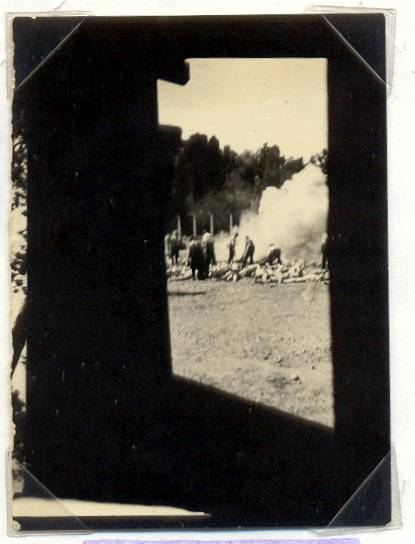
Sonderkommando in Auschwitz-Birkenau,
August 1944 (clandestine photo)

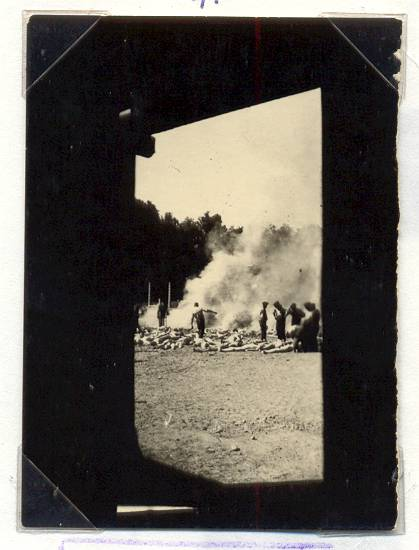
Sonderkommando in Auschwitz-Birkenau,
August 1944 (clandestine photo)

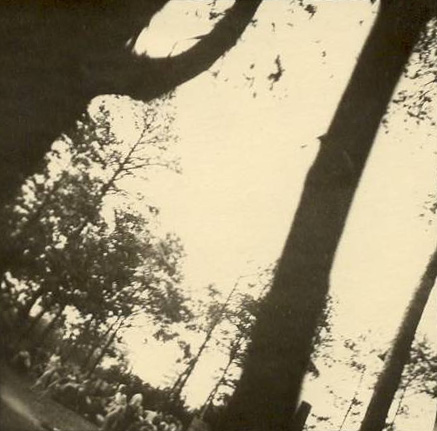
Sonderkommando in Auschwitz-Birkenau,
August 1944 (clandestine photo)
Close-ups of subject area (from above)
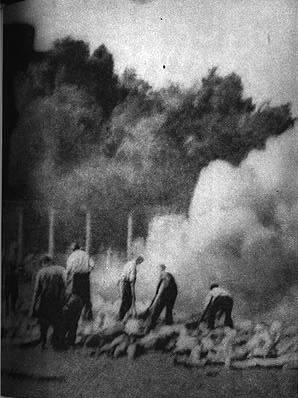
Sonderkommando in Auschwitz-Birkenau,
August 1944. Incineration of corpses

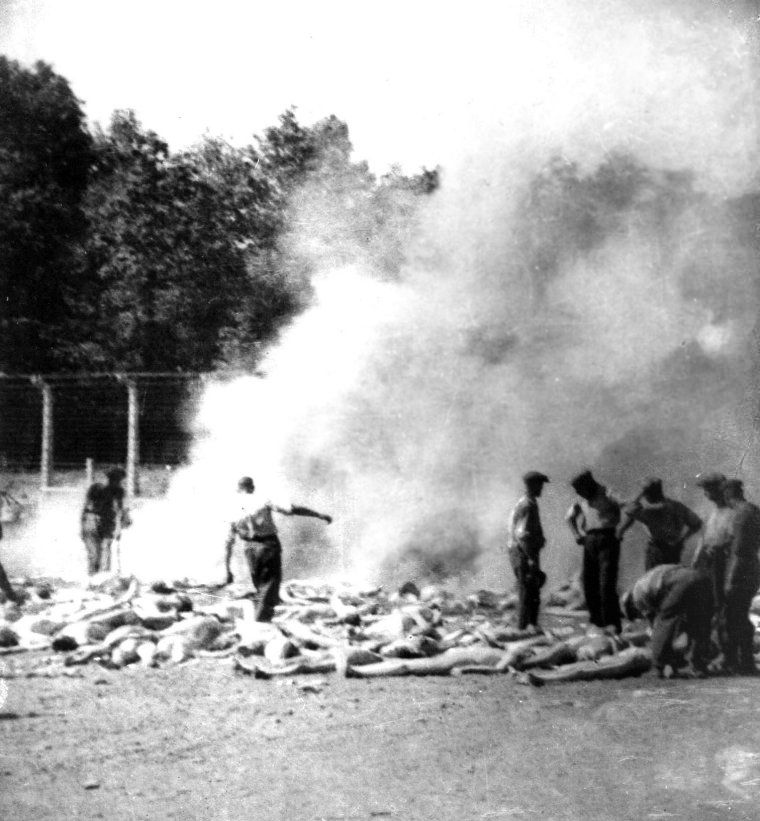
Sonderkommando in Auschwitz-Birkenau,
August 1944

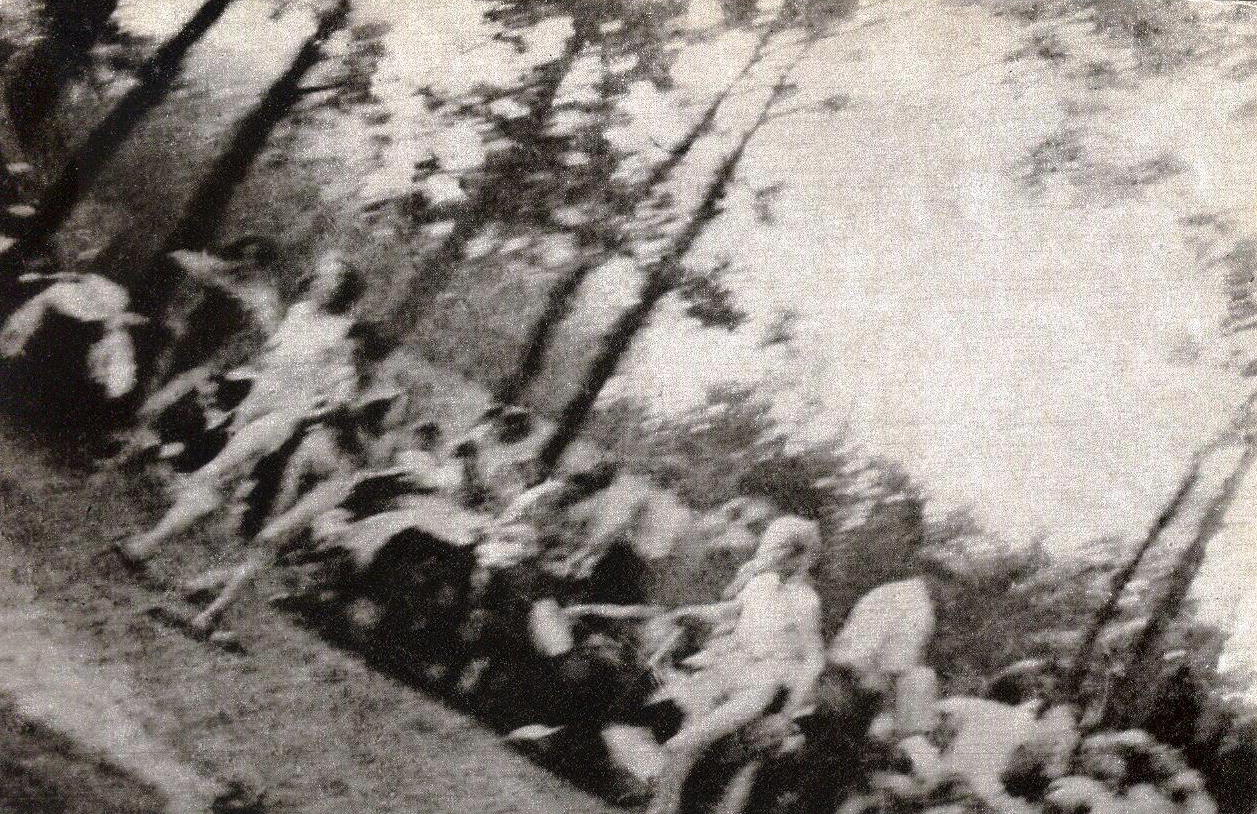
Sonderkommando in Auschwitz-Birkenau,
August 1944. The march to "showers"

== See also ==
- Ala Gertner
- David Olère
- Filip Müller
- The Grey Zone
- Henryk Mandelbaum
- Henryk Tauber
- Kapo
- Kommando
- Leib Langfus
- Morris Venezia
- Rose Meth
- Roza Robota
- Shlomo Venezia
- Shoah (film)
- Son of Saul
- Sonderaktion 1005
- Ypatingasis būrys
