= Nathan Lopes Cardozo =

Dutch-Israeli rabbi, philosopher and scholar

- נתן לופס קרדוזו

Personal life
- Education: Gateshead Talmudical College

Religious life
- Religion: Orthodox Judaism

Nathan Lopes Cardozo (Hebrew: נתן לופס קרדוזו; born 1946) is a Dutch-born Israeli Orthodox rabbi and Jewish philosopher, founder of the David Cardozo Academy in Jerusalem.

== Childhood and education ==
Nathan Lopes Cardozo was born in Amsterdam and named after his father's youngest brother who was killed in the Holocaust. His father was a secular Jew who was proud of his Portuguese Jewish origin. His mother was an orphan. When her Christian parents died, she was raised by Jewish family members and became part of the community and spoke their language. During the Holocaust, she saved her husband and his family by hiding them in her apartment in the center of Amsterdam while it was under Nazi occupation. Many times she risked her life by telling the Nazis that her husband and family were already taken to the concentration camps.

Due to his birth to a non-Jewish mother, Cardozo was technically not halakhically Jewish (natural-born Jewish status is conferred through one’s mother), but at age sixteen he formally converted to Judaism through the Amsterdam Rabbinate, formed by Hacham Salomon Rodrigues Pereira, Chief Rabbi Aron Schuster and Rabbi Benjamin Pels. His mother later converted to Judaism as well.

Cardozo spent the next 12 years studying at various Haredi Yeshivas such as Gateshead Talmudical College He received his semikhah from Rabbi Aryeh Leib Gurwicz, rosh yeshiva of Gateshead. He also studied at the Mir Yeshiva. He later received his Doctorate in Philosophy from Columbia Pacific University.

== Rabbinic career ==
Cardozo is the Founder and Dean of the David Cardozo Academy and the Bet Midrash of Avraham Avinu in Jerusalem. The academy is named for his great-great-grandfather, Rabbi David Cardozo, who was Chief Rabbi of Amsterdam's Portuguese-Spanish Synagogue. Cardozo is the author of 13 books and numerous articles in both English and Hebrew. He heads a Think Tank focused on finding new Halachic and philosophical approaches to dealing with the crisis of religion and identity amongst Jews and the Jewish State of Israel.

Some view Cardozo's opinions on the tenets of Judaism as not compatible with conventional Orthodox thought and custom. Rabbi Avrohom Gordimer, a rabbinic coordinator for the Orthodox Union, said that Cardozo has "accepted the approach of the Conservative movement, which postulates that Halacha is not objective divine truth, is not fixed, and that it must change in accordance with the values of the times and with various needs." Notably, Cardozo believes that the biblical prohibition against two men engaging in homosexual acts only applies to those who are purely heterosexual.

Cardozo's ideas are debated social media, blogs, books and other forums. Cardozo maintains that his views remain within the acceptable realm of Orthodoxy and on numerous occasions distanced them from the Reform & Conservative movements.

== Personal ==
At the age of 21, he married Freyda Gnesin, a woman of Eastern European descent whom he met in the synagogue of Haarlem. After his mother's conversion to Judaism, Cardozo changed his name from Nathan the son of Abraham (being the standard name for someone not born Jewish) to Nathan son of Jacob.

Cardozo has five children and lives in the Bayit V'Gan neighborhood of Jerusalem.

== Books ==
- Thoughts to Ponder: Daring Observations About the Jewish Tradition
- The Torah as God's Mind
- Judaism on Trial: An Unconventional Discussion about Jews, Judaism and the State of Israel
- The Infinite Chain
- Between Silence and Speech
- Crisis, Covenant and Creativity: Jewish Thoughts for a Complex World
- For the Love of Israel and the Jewish People: Essays and Studies on Israel, Jews and Judaism
- The Tent of Avraham: Gleanings from the David Cardozo Academy
- The Written and Oral Torah.

In 2016, Cardozo wrote an Introduction to the Nehalel Siddur, and a foreword for A Damaged Mirror: A story of memory and redemption. His autobiography, Lonely But Not Alone, was released in late 2016. A film bearing the same name, Lonely But Not Alone, was made about his life.
