= Morris Venezia =

Holocaust survivor

- Born: Maurice Venezia; 25 February 1921; Thessaloniki, Salonica, Greece
- Died: September 2, 2013 (aged 92); Palm Springs, California, U.S.

Maurice Venezia (25 February 1921 – 2 September 2013), later Morris Venezia, was an Italian-Greek Jewish survivor of the Auschwitz concentration camp. A member of the special squads, Sonderkommando, he was one of the few remaining eyewitnesses to the gas chambers at the time of his death.

He was the brother of Shlomo Venezia. After the end of World War II, he lived in California.

== Biography ==
Venezia was descended from Sephardi Jews who were expelled from Spain in 1492 (with the Alhambra Decree) and traveled throughout Europe before settling in Greek Macedonia, under the Ottoman Empire. While residing in the Republic of Venice, the Venezia family acquired the last name Venezia (Venice) and Italian citizenship.

In Thessaloniki Morris's family - with scarce economic means - was part of the community of Italian Jews; the children attended the Italian school in Thessaloniki (a school aligned to the Italian prevailing Fascist doctrine). His father, Isacco Venezia, a barber, had left as a young man to join the Italian armed forces as a volunteer during World War I. Thanks to this, when his father died, Morris could go and study in Italy for free, at a high school (Istituto tecnico) in Milan, through the intervention of the Italian Consulate in Thessaloniki; Morris's family (his mother Doudoun (Angel), his younger brother Shlomo, and younger sisters Rachel, Marika and Martha) could live in Thessaloniki with the support of their relatives.

When the Racial Laws against the Jews were introduced in 1938, Morris was expelled from Italy, without finishing his studies, and returned to Greece. In 1940, after the Italian declaration of war, the subsequent invasion of Greece and the bombardment of Thessaloniki (November 3, 1940), by the Italian armed forces, the Greek police began arresting people of Italian nationality. Many Italians were captured, including Maurice, and imprisoned in a building in the center of the city; afterwards, they were transferred around Athens and were released on arrival of the Italian Army.

When the German troops arrived and occupied Northern Greece, the Italian Consulate in Thessaloniki organized a voluntary transfer of the Italians either to Sicily or to Athens. The Morris family remained in Athens as refugees. This was to prove a dire choice.

After 8 September 1943, as Italy signed an armistice with the Allies, Athens came under full German power.

Morris and Shlomo joined the Greek partisans, while remaining in Athens. As the months passed, the control of the Nazis on the Greek Jews became more and more pressing, with deportations and with the introduction of a weekly sign-in obligation at the Jewish Community: in March 1944, as they were signing, they were arrested and detained in an Athens prison (Haidari). Shortly after, they were deported to Auschwitz concentration camp.

== Sonderkommando ==
The brothers Maurice and Shlomo, with their cousins Dario and Jakob Gabbai and their families, arrived in Auschwitz on 11 April 1944.

Maurice and Shlomo were chosen by the SS to enter the Sonderkommando, because they had declared to be barbers and were young and vigorous; they were assigned to different buildings, and subsequently worked together in the camp.

In the Sonderkommando units, the Jews were forced to work in the gas chambers and the crematories of the camp. Not only did they have to move the bodies from the gas chambers to the crematories, but they also had the horrible duty of undressing, shaving, and searching the dead bodies for gold teeth and hidden riches, thereafter spoliating them of what they were to find and amassing it for the Nazis. They had to do it by sorting the dead and piling them out in the open. This was to be done because even hair was considered by the Nazis re-usable goods, not to mention eyeglasses or artificial limbs and clothing.

Morris features throughout "Auschwitz - The Final Witness", a 2001 NY Festival winning film made by Sky for Channel 5, which reunited him with his two Sonderkommando cousins as they revisited the death camp together for the first time in over 50 years.

He died in September 2013 in Palm Springs, California, at the age of 92.

== See also ==
- Shlomo Venezia
- Dario Gabbai
- Sonderkommando
- History of the Jews in Thessaloniki

== Bibliography ==
- Shlomo Venezia, Sonderkommando Auschwitz, Penguin Books, 2007
- Auschwitz: The Nazis and the 'Final Solution'. BBC Books. 2005. ISBN 978-0-563-52296-6.
- (in Italian)Marcello Pezzetti, Il libro della Shoah italiana: i racconti di chi è sopravvissuto, Einaudi, Torino, 2009, 363
