= David Olère =

Polish-born French painter and sculptor (1902–1985)

- Born: January 19, 1902; Warsaw
- Died: August 21, 1985; Paris, France
- Education: Warsaw Academy of Fine Arts
- Known for: Paintings and drawings depicting experiences at Auschwitz
- Style: Expressionist, Figurative
- Spouse: Juliette Ventura
- Children: Alexandre Olère

David Olère (January 19, 1902 – August 21, 1985) was a Polish-born French painter and sculptor best known for his explicit drawings and paintings based on his experiences as a Jewish Sonderkommando inmate at Auschwitz concentration camp during World War II.

== Life ==
Olère was born in Warsaw. He studied at the Warsaw Academy of Fine Arts, and upon completion of his studies there at the age of 16, moved to Danzig and later Berlin, where he exhibited woodcuts at museums and art houses. In 1921 he was hired by Ernst Lubitsch at the Europäische Film Allianz to work as a set builder for the film Das Weib des Pharao. Olère also lived in Munich and Heidelberg before moving to Paris in 1928 and settling in Montparnasse, where he designed costumes and publicity posters for Paramount Pictures. In 1930, Olère married Juliette Ventura who gave birth to their son, Alexandre. When war broke out, Olère was drafted into the infantry regiment at Lons-le-Saunier.

== The Holocaust ==
On February 20, 1943, Olère was arrested by French police, under the Marechal Pétain, during a round up of Jews in Seine-et-Oise and placed in Drancy internment camp. On March 2, 1943, he was one of approximately 1,000 Jews deported from Drancy to Auschwitz. From this transport, Olère was one of 119 people selected for work; the rest were gassed shortly after arrival. He was registered as prisoner 106144 and assigned to the Sonderkommando at Birkenau, the unit of prisoners forced to empty gas chambers and burn the bodies, firstly working in Bunker 2 and later in Crematorium III. In addition to these duties, he was also forced to work as an illustrator, writing and decorating letters for the SS.

Olère remained at Auschwitz until January 19, 1945, when he was taken on the evacuation death march, eventually reaching Mauthausen concentration camp, then the Melk and Ebensee subcamps, from which he made five unsuccessful escape attempts. Following his liberation on May 6, 1945, he learned that his entire family had been exterminated in Warsaw. He subsequently moved back to Paris, where he died in 1985.

== Art ==
Olère began to draw at Auschwitz during the last days of the camp, when the SS became less attentive. His work has exceptional documentary value: there are no photos of what happened in the gas chambers and crematoria, and Olère was the only artist to have worked as a member of the Sonderkommando and survived. He was also the first witness to draw plans and cross-sections to explain how the crematoria worked.

Olère felt compelled to capture Auschwitz artistically to illustrate the fate of all those that did not survive. He sometimes depicts himself in his paintings as a ghostly witnessing face in the background. He exhibited his work at the State Museum of Les Invalides and the Grand Palais in Paris, at the Jewish Museum in New York City, at the Berkeley Museum, and in Chicago. He retired from being an artist in 1962, and died in 1985. His widow and son have continued to inform the world about Auschwitz via his artwork.

== Bibliography ==
- Hoffmann, Detleft (1998). Das Gedächtnis der Dinge. Campus Verlag. ISBN 978-3-593-35445-3
- Serge Klarsfeld (ed.), David Olère: un peintre au sonderkommando à Auschwitz (David Olère: a Painter in the Sonderkommando at Auschwitz) bilingual French-English edition. . New York: The Beate Klarsfeld Foundation, 1989
- Miriam Novitch, Spiritual Resistance: Art from Concentration Camps 1940–1945 - a selection of drawings and paintings from the collection of Kibbutz Lochamei Haghetaot, Israel. Union of American Hebrew Congregations, 1981
- Alexandre Oler, Witness: Images of Auschwitz, illustrations by David Olère. Texas: WestWind Press (imprint of D. & F. Scott Publishing), 1998. ISBN 0-941037-69-X
- Alexandre Oler, Un génocide en héritage (French edition of Witness: Images of Auschwitz), Paris: Wern Éditions, 1998. ISBN 2-912487-35-8
- Sujo, Glenn; Imperial War Museum (Great Britain) (2001). Legacies of silence: the visual arts and the Holocaust memory. New Age International. ISBN 978-0-85667-534-8
