= We Wept Without Tears =

1999 book by Gideon Greif

- Author: Gideon Greif
- Original title: Bakhinu beli dema'ot
- Subject: Holocaust
- Publication date: 1999
- English publication date: 2005
- Dewey Decimal: 940.531853858
- LC Class: D805.5.A96

We Wept Without Tears: Testimonies of the Jewish Sonderkommando from Auschwitz, is a book by Gideon Greif. First published in Hebrew in 1999, the work was translated into English in 2005. Greif's book based on a series of interviews with surviving members of Sonderkommando - Jewish prisoners who survived by working in the German death camps. The writer, Gideon Greif, is a researcher at Yad Vashem (יד ושם), Israel, the principal institution in the world studying the history of the Holocaust. He had also served as a visiting professor at The Sue and Leonard Miller Center for Contemporary Judaic Studies, the University of Miami.

The Sonderkommando, who were work units of Nazi death camp prisoners forced to aid the killing process at Auschwitz and Birkenau camps, consisted mainly of Jewish prisoners. The book is based on interviews with survivors of units of the Sonderkommando. A note by the publishers states: "The book provides direct testimony about the 'Final Solution of the Jewish Problem,' but it is also a unique document on the boundless cruelty and deceit practiced by the Germans. It documents the helplessness and powerlessness of the one-and-a-half million people, 90 percent of them Jews, who were brutally murdered in the gas chambers of Auschwitz-Birkenau."

== Critical reception ==
- In 2002, Trevor Royle of the Glasgow Sunday Herald identified We Wept Without Tears as a "groundbreaking" historical work that helped bring the story of the Jewish Sonderkommando "out of the closet."
