= Trotz Allem =

Social centre in Witten, Germany

- Logo
- Founded: 1999
- Type: self-managed social centre, youth club
- Location: Witten
- Coordinates: 51.44312°N 7.33208°E
- Website: trotzallem.noblogs.org at the Wayback Machine (archived 3 September 2026)

Trotz Allem ("In spite of it all") is a self-managed social centre and youth club in Witten, Germany. The first space was rented from 1999 until 2005. The second space opened in 2006 and reopened after renovations in 2010. The centre hosts various groups and the Gustav Landauer Library Witten.

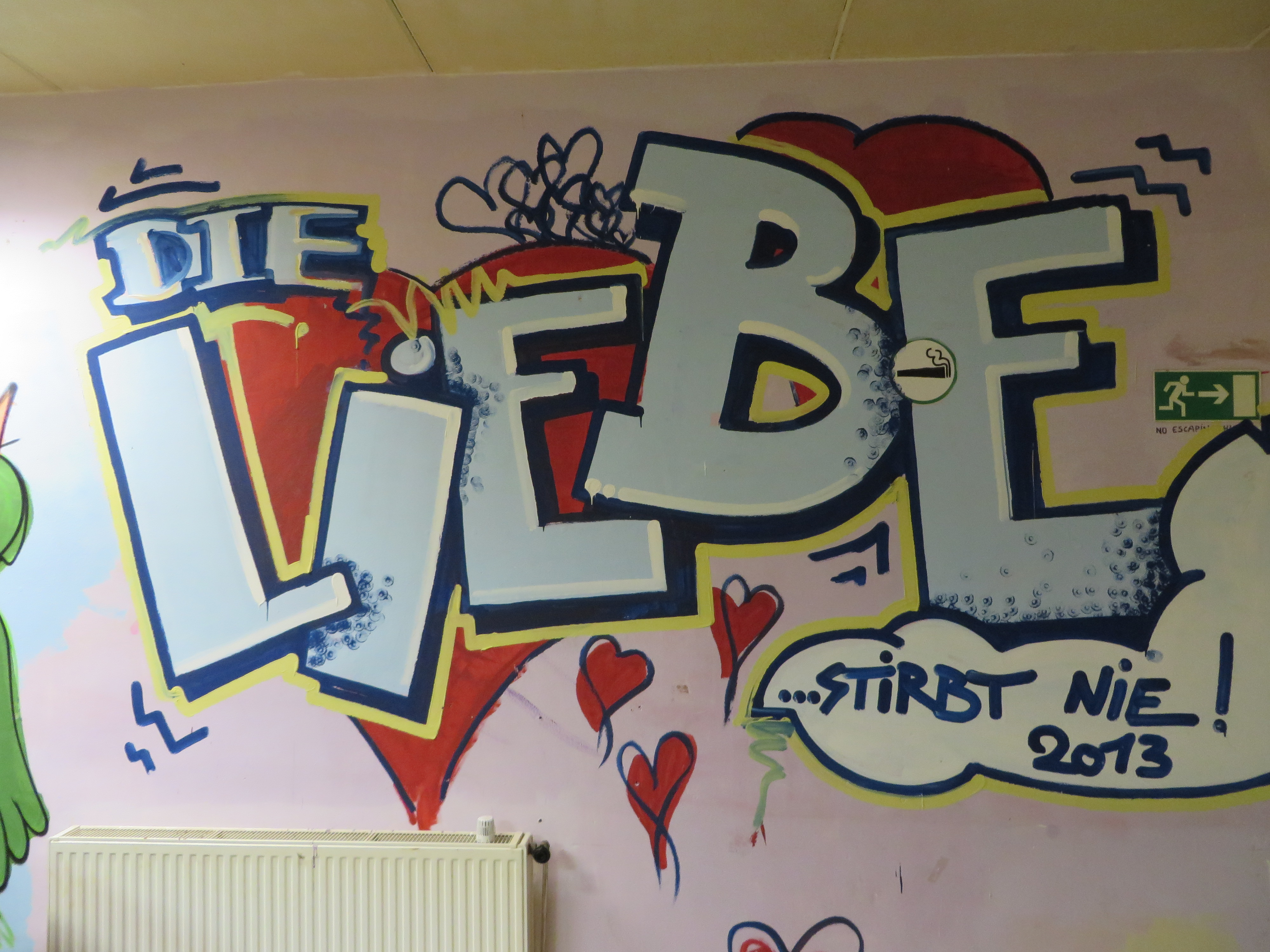
Graffiti inside Trotz Allem: Love never dies 2013

== History ==
The initiative for a self-managed, noncommercial meeting point in Witten began in 1998. In March 1999, a former shop in the residential building at Herbeder Straße 8 was rented and in April the Trotz Allem ("In spite of it all") was opened. The shop had first been used by the Witten subsidiary of Deutscher Metallarbeiter-Verband (German Metalworkers Union) and then by the Communist Party during the Weimar Republic. The name relates to the conservative Kohl era, when similar names to Trotz Allem were used in Witten in the 1980s when an Initiative Trotzalledem from the Witten Green Party published a magazine Trotz-Dem.

Trotz Allem has hosted talks, discussions, film evenings, parties, concerts and childcare mornings. Vegetarian food was served under the name Supp-Kultur (soup culture) on Thursdays. The centre organized events with survivors of Auschwitz concentration camp Henryk Mandelbaum and Stanisław Hantz. During the night of 3 December 2005, a group of Neo-Nazis threw bottles at the entrance. Two visitors were hit but nobody was seriously injured. As a result, the landlord did not renew the rental contract that expired on the end of 2005.

A new clubhouse was then opened in Augustastraße 58, in August 2006. The space was previously used by a Portuguese culture club and coat of arms with elements of the coat of arms and flag of Portugal is still visible at the counter. After an inspection by the fire department, the building regulations authority and the office of public order the Trotz Allem was closed in October 2006. In May 2007 a demonstration and street festival in favor of the reopening occurred.

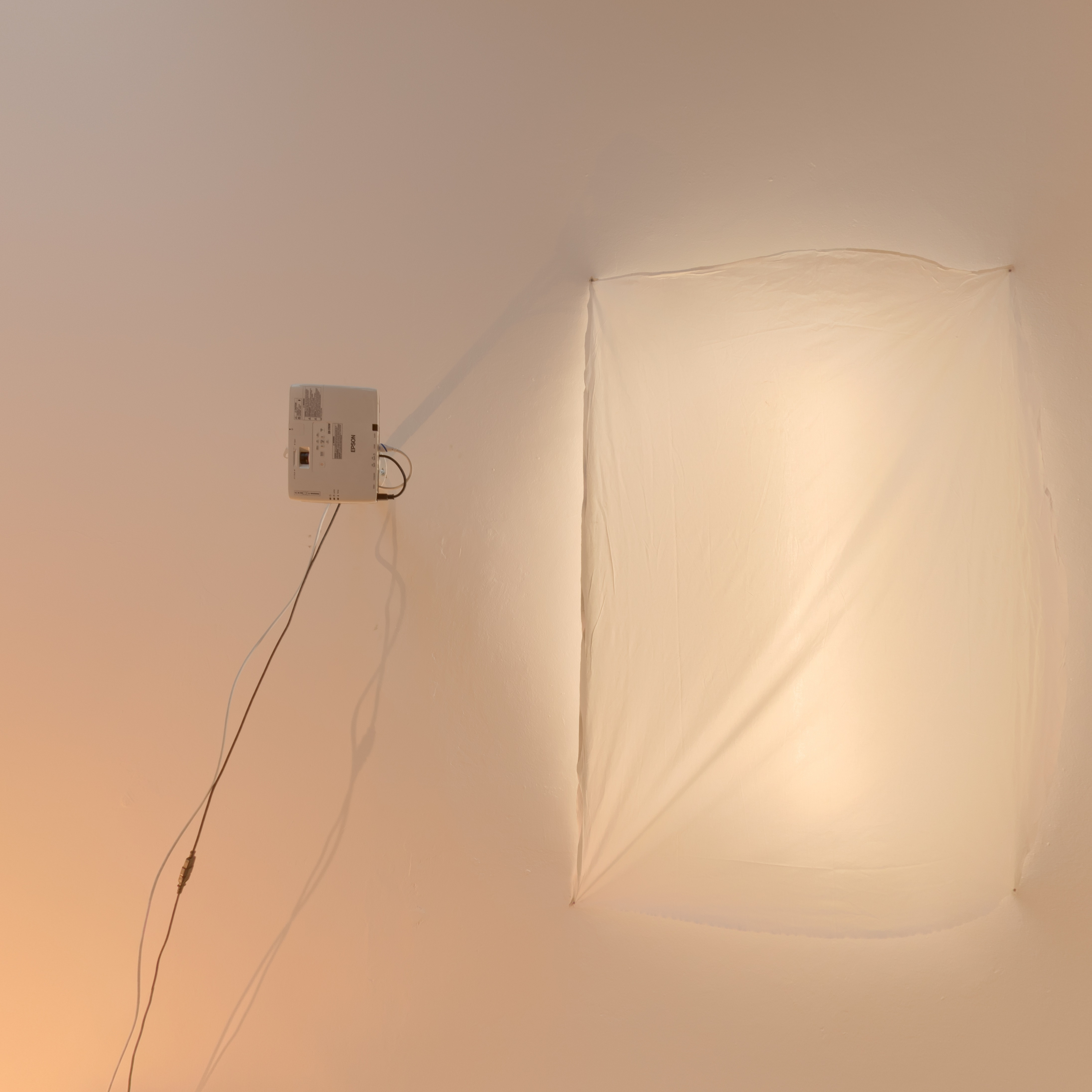
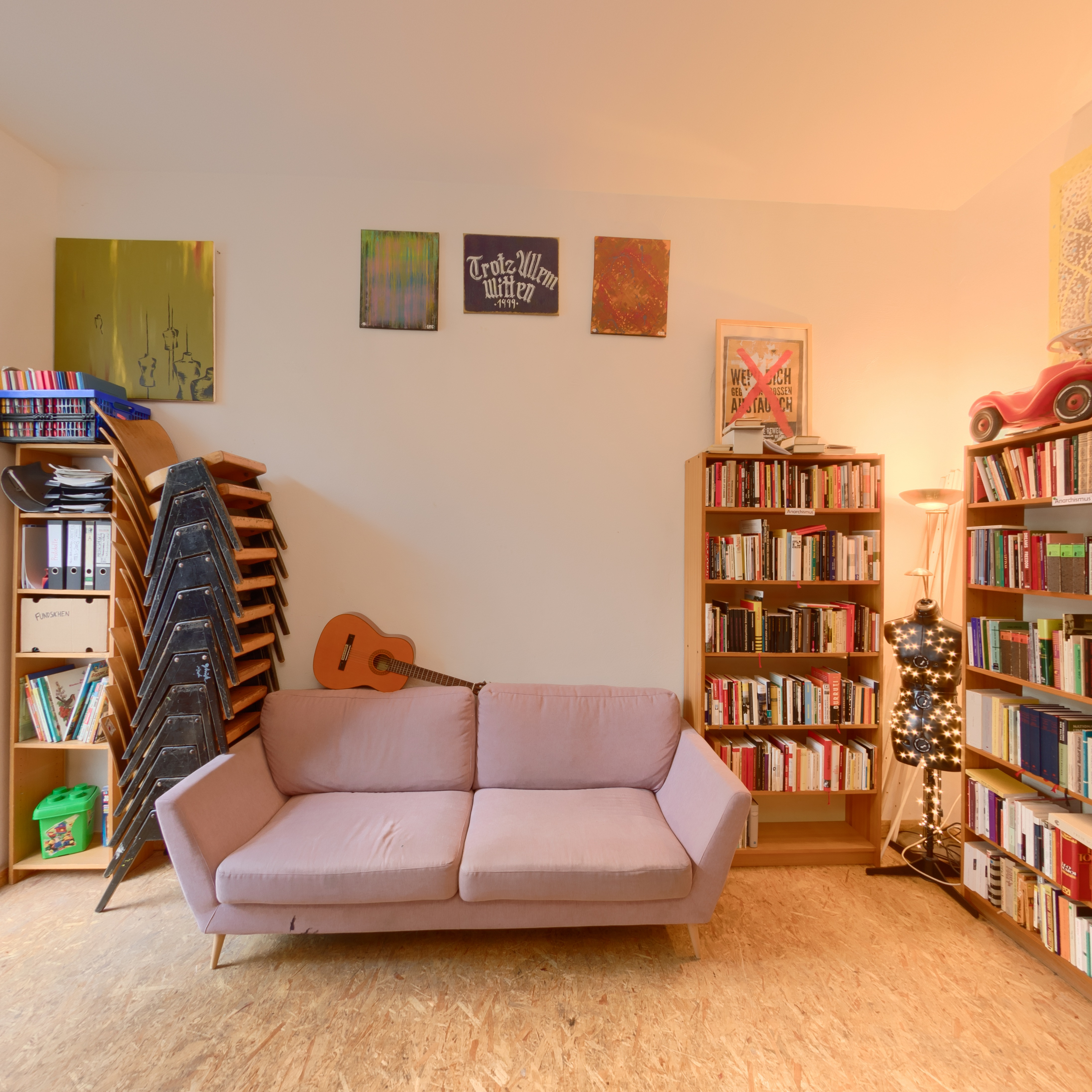
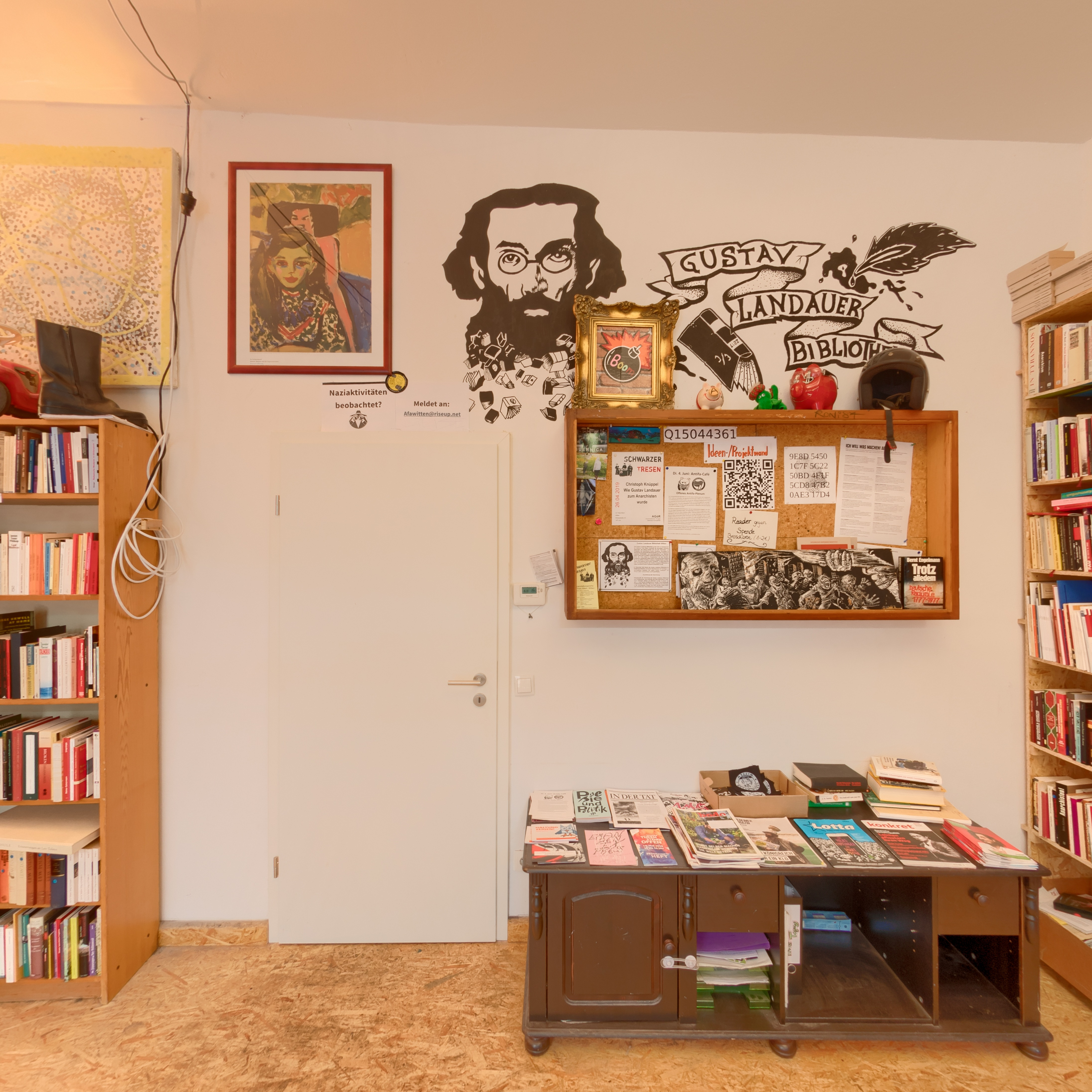
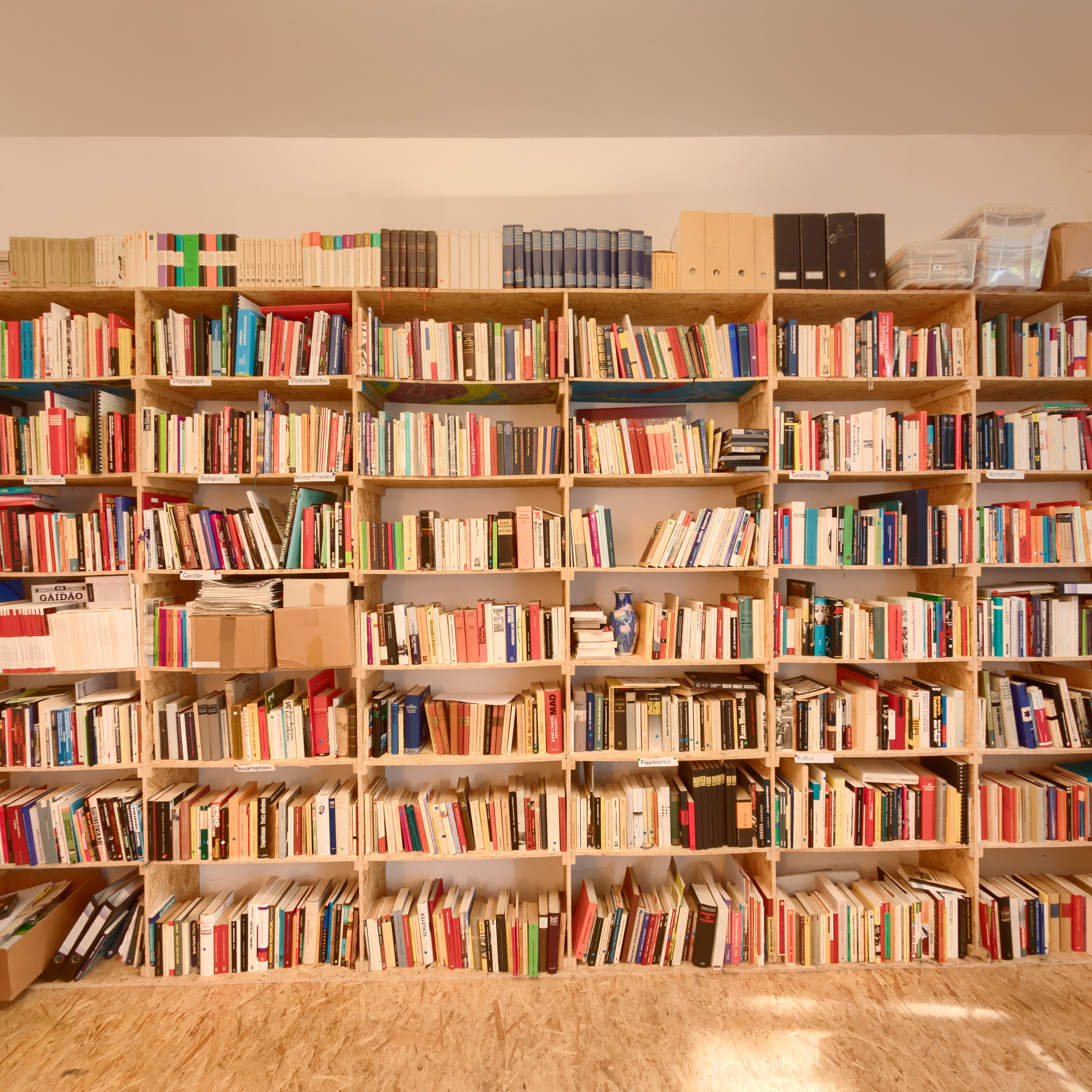
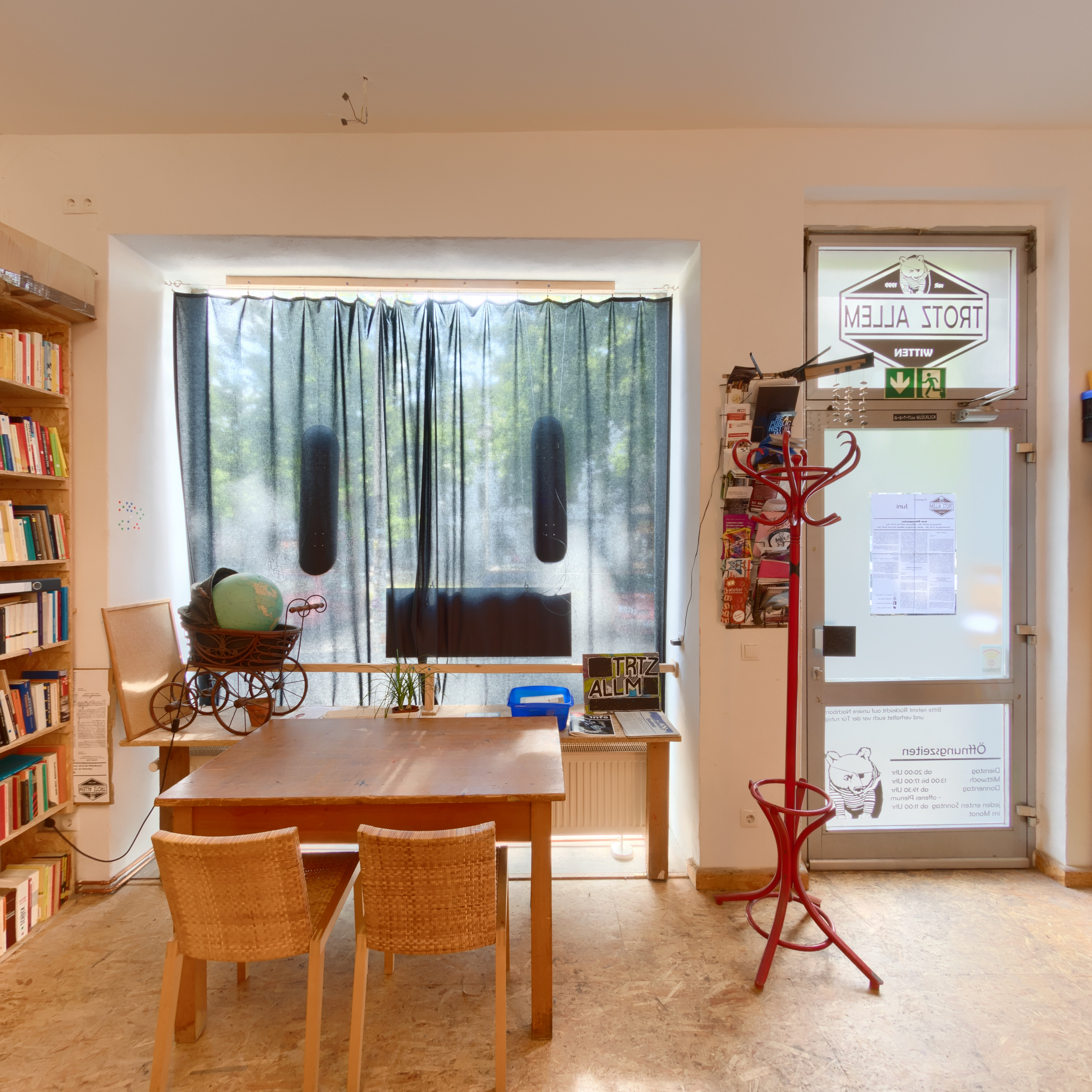
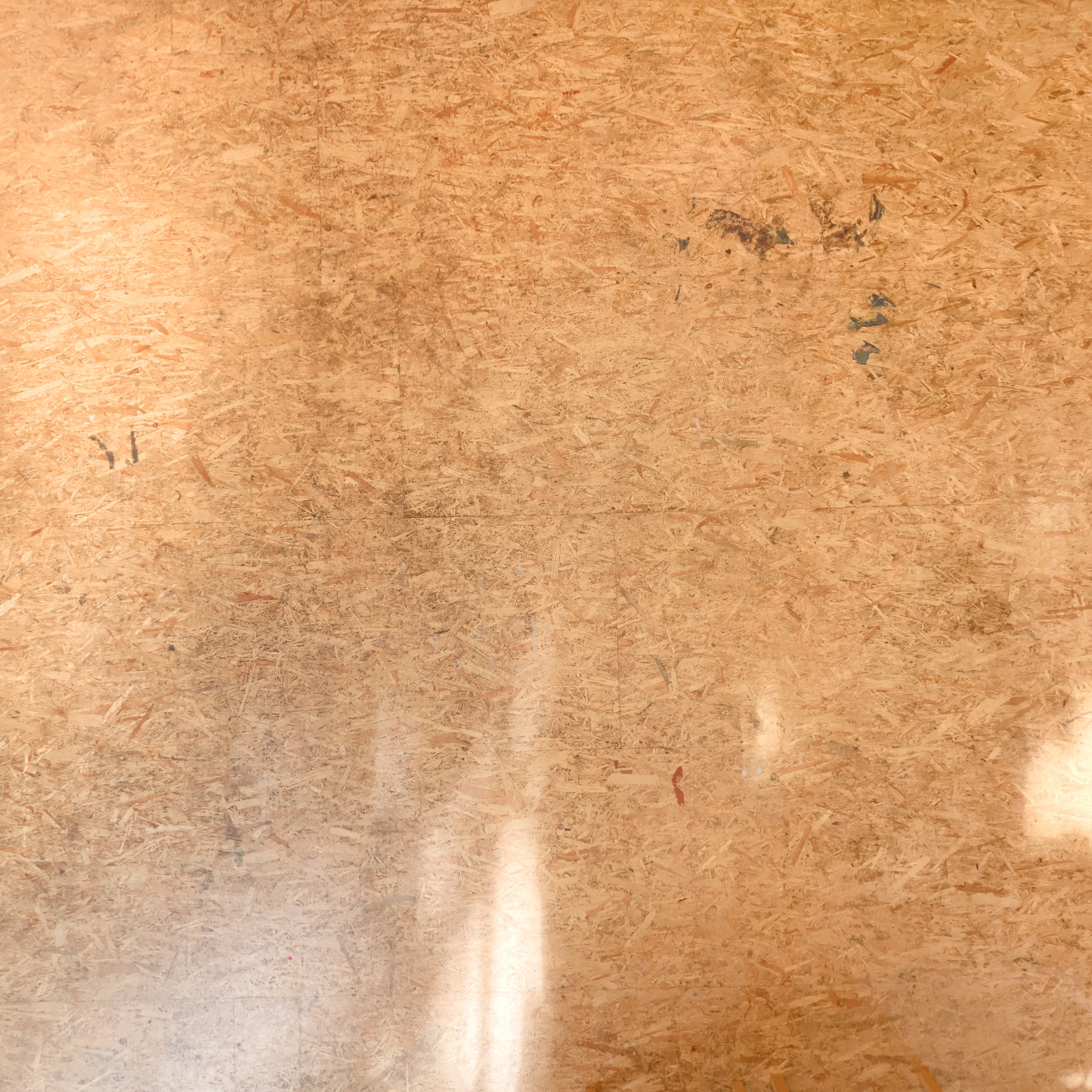
360° panorama of Gustav Landauer Library Witten

After making alterations, Trotz Allem reopened in July 2010. An infoshop was established that was later closed in 2012; a library named Gustav Landauer Library Witten after the German anarchist Gustav Landauer was opened in December 2011.

== Initiatives ==
Among others, the Gustav Landauer Library Witten and the Anarchist Group Eastern Ruhr are located in Trotz Allem. An antifa café, a women's café, and a brunch are held monthly, a kitchen for all is held biweekly, and a summer festival is held annually.
