= Gideon Greif =

Israeli historian

- גדעון גרייף
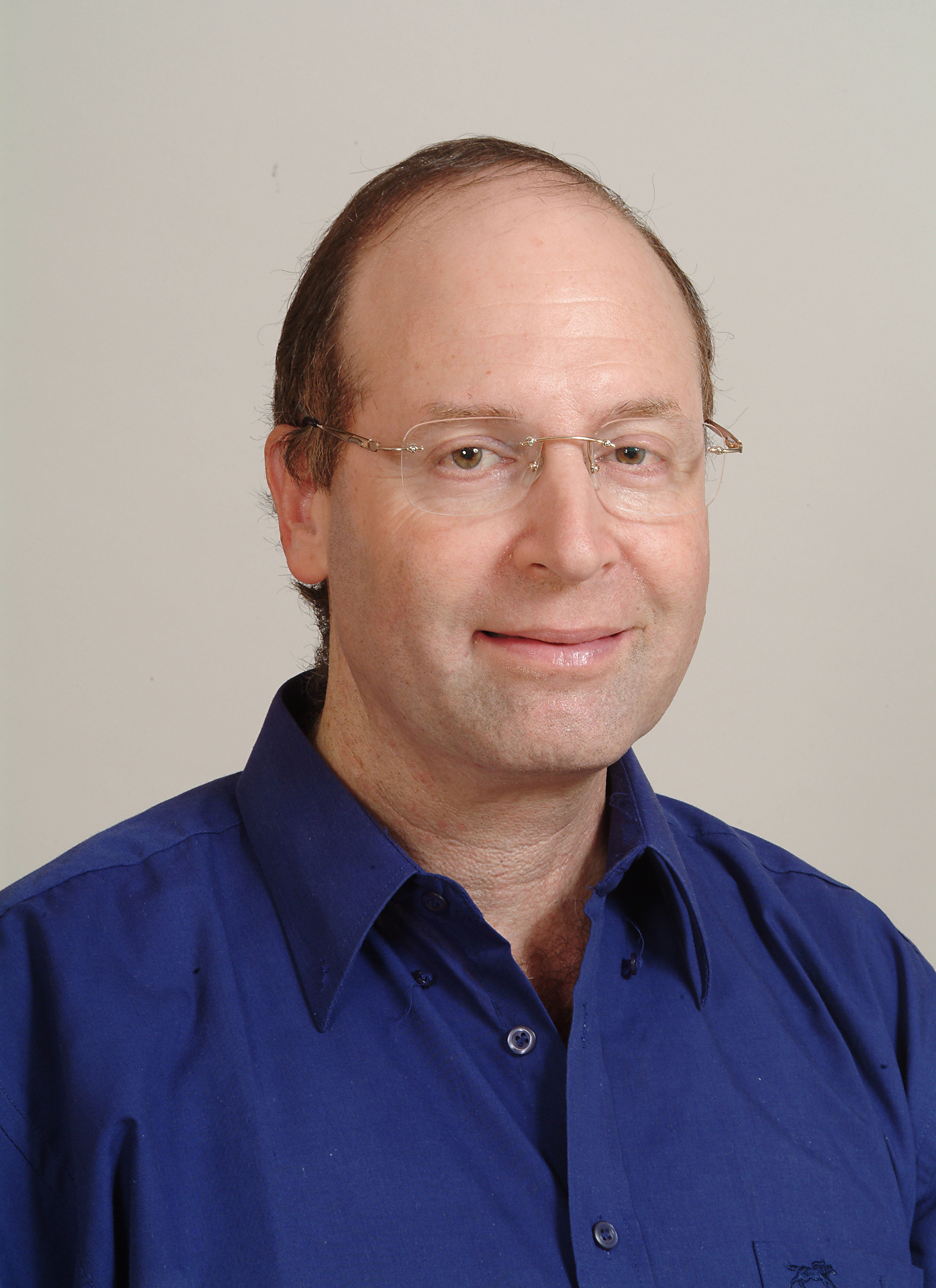
- Greif in 2002
- Born: 16 March 1951 (age 75)
- Occupation: Historian

Academic background
- Education: Tel Aviv University
- Alma mater: University of Vienna

Academic work
- Notable works: We Wept Without Tears

Gideon Greif (Hebrew: גדעון גרייף; born 16 March 1951) is an Israeli historian who specializes in the history of the Holocaust, especially the history of the Auschwitz concentration camp and particularly the Sonderkommando in Auschwitz. He served as a visiting lecturer for Jewish and Israeli History at the Schusterman Center for Jewish Studies at the University of Texas at Austin during the academic year 2011–2012. He headed a commission that issued a report in July 2021 that denied that the killing of Bosnian Muslims at and around Srebrenica in July 1995 constituted genocide.

== Education ==
From 1965 until 1969 Gideon Greif attended Municipal High School (Gymnasium) in Tel Aviv. Later, from 1974 to 1976 he attended Tel Aviv University where he received his bachelor's degree in Jewish history, studying the history of the land of Israel. Between 1976 and 1982 he did his master's degree in Jewish History at Tel Aviv University. From 1996 until 2001 he studied at the University of Vienna from which he was awarded his PhD.

== Exhibitions ==
Greif was the scientific advisor and historical consultant for the exhibition "With Me Here Are Six Million Accusers" which marked the 50th anniversary of Adolf Eichmann's trial in 1961, inaugurated April 11, 2011, at Yad Vashem, Jerusalem. The exhibition described Eichmann's career at the SS, his personal responsibility for the deportation of millions of Jews to the ghettos and extermination camps, his attempts to hide after the war and the operation of his discovery and seizure in Argentina in 1960. The exhibition aimed to prove that Eichmann was not the "murderer behind the desk", but a fanatic foe of the Jews, determined to send them to their deaths.

== Special projects ==
In 2006 Greif initiated the "Authentic Box Car" project, which stands on the ramp of Birkenau, not far from the main entrance to the camp, as a permanent memorial to the hundreds of thousands of Hungarian Jews murdered by the Germans in the gas chambers of Birkenau in 1944, and dedicated to the memory of Hugo Lowy.

Greif's book We Wept Without Tears inspired Hungarian director László Nemes to create the film Son of Saul dedicated to the Sonderkommando. The film won the 2016 Academy Awards for the best foreign language film, and also won the 2016 Golden Globe for the Best Motion Picture - Foreign Language.

=== Controversy ===
==== Serb victims at Jasenovac ====
In January 2017, together with representatives of Serbian and Jewish academic societies and the Serbian government representatives to the United States, Greif assisted the exhibition Jasenovac 75 in New Jersey covering crimes committed by Croatian Ustaše in the Jasenovac concentration camp, including genocide against the Serbs. In January 2018, with Serbian representatives Greif co-organised the exhibition Jasenovac - pravo na nezaborav at the United Nations in New York. The exhibition was criticized by the Croatian MVEP for "spreading false information and propaganda". Greif spent four years examining archives in research of the genocide in fascist Independent State of Croatia, in which he affirmed a number of more than 700,000-800,000 Serb victims in Jasenovac. Dr. Robert Rosett, Senior Historian at the International Institute for Holocaust Research at Yad Vashem, stated that the number of victims murdered at Jasenovac were "many times greater than the absurdly low figure of 4,500 cited by Goldman, and many times less than the grossly inflated count of more than 800,000 that was widely touted in the Communist era". Journalist Alexander Brezar of Haaretz wrote that Greif is "popular among Serb nationalists and revisionists for repeatedly inflating the number of Serb victims at Jasenovac." According to the United States Holocaust Memorial Museum, somewhere between 77,000 and 99,000 Serbs, Jews, Roma, and Croat opponents of the Ustaša regime were killed at Jasenovac, of whom between 45,000 and 52,000 were ethnic Serbs.

==== Srebrenica Commission ====
In 2019, Greif was appointed by Bosnia's member of presidency and Serb entity Republika Srpska leader Milorad Dodik to head an independent International Commission of Inquiry to probe the events of the Srebrenica massacre during the war in Bosnia and Herzegovina (1992-1995). The concluding report published in July 2021 denied genocide in Srebrenica, "also repeatedly casts the Bosniaks as aggressors and the Bosnian Serbs as victims" prior to 1995. The International Criminal Tribunal for the former Yugoslavia as well as the International Court of Justice and domestic courts have characterised these killings as genocide. American and U.N. diplomats and the Srebrenica Genocide Memorial Center commented that the commission was a bid to rewrite history, as the Republika Srpska's officials, including Milorad Dodik, had openly minimised the number of killed or denied it was a genocide. General Counsel of the World Jewish Congress, Menachem Z. Rosensaft, who teaches genocide law at Columbia Law School, strongly criticised the report, calling it an "embarrassment". Brezar commented that Serb nationalist politicians "are hiring Jewish experts on the Holocaust – and not for their expertise. Rather, they need Jews as tokens to legitimize their projects of historical revisionism". Writing in the Israeli newspaper Haaretz, Rosensaft criticized Greif for declaring on Republika Srpska television that "I am Jewish, I know what genocide means… Nobody can tell me what genocide is, and this event was no genocide."

In November 2021, Greif was announced as a recipient for an award of special achievement by the German government for his work on the Holocaust. However, following diplomatic fallout in Germany due to his contention that the Srebrenica massacre perpetrated by Bosnian Serb forces in 1995 did not constitute genocide, the German Foreign Ministry in December 2021 announced that the award has been "withdrawn", explaining that the conclusions of the commission headed by Greif "contradict the case law of the International Criminal Tribunal for the former Yugoslavia, the International Court of Justice and the Convention on the Prevention and Punishment of Genocide".

Later, Israeli media published alleged Greif's interview where he said that he accepted number of 8,000 deaths, but still denies it was genocide due to the fact that an absolute majority of victims were men in the attempt to break towards the territory controlled by the Bosniak army, prompting the associate executive Vice President of the World Jewish Congress, Menachem Rosensaft to say this was "a rather desperate attempt at damage control." "No amount of prevarication or sophistry on his part can change the fundamental fact that the parameters of the crime of genocide are set forth in the Genocide Convention and have been repeatedly and consistently applied to Srebrenica by successive tribunals", Rosensaft added. Greif denied later on that he gave any statement to Israeli media and accused the radical organisation the Muslim Brotherhood and Bosniak politicians for the anti-campaign against the report.

== Awards ==
For his involvement "in defense of the truth about the suffering of the Jewish, Serbian and other peoples during the World War II" he was awarded the Golden Medal for Merits of the Republic of Serbia.

- Knight of the St. Sava Order of Diplomatic Pacifism (Serbian: Vitez svetosavskog pacifizma)
- Sretenje Order- Golden Award for Merits (Serbian: Sretenjski orden - zlatna medalja za zasluge)
- Plaque of Jasenovac Martyrs (Serbian: Plaketa Jasenovackih stradalnika)
- Sokolov Award, Israeli journalism award, awarded by the Tel Aviv municipality, in memory of Nahum Sokolow.

== Books ==
- Jasenovac Ausvic Balkana - Ustaska Imperija Okrutnosti, Jasenovac Auschwitz of the Balkans - Ustasha Empire of Cruelty, ISBN 9789655727272
- Alojzije Stepinac Ustaski Vikar - Pokrsti Se Ili Umri - 101 Razlog Zasto Ne Moze Biti Svetac - Alojzije Stepinac Ustasha Vicar - Convert or Die - 101 Reason Why He Cannot Be a Saint, ISBN 9788677124502
- Ustasko Konacno Resenje Pre Nacistickog - Ustasha Final Solution Before Nazi Final Solution, ISBN 9788677124519
