= Henryk Mandelbaum =

Holocaust survivor

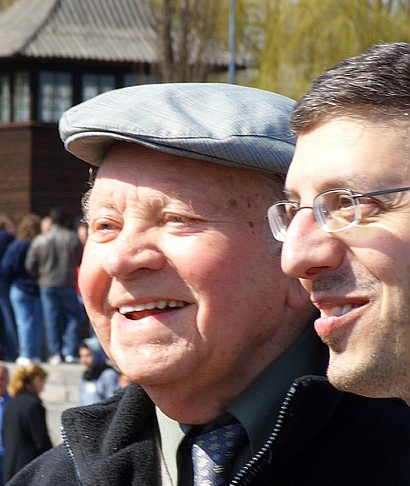
- Born: December 15, 1922; Olkusz
- Died: June 17, 2008 (aged 85); Bytom, Poland
- Other name: Prisoner number 181970
- Occupations: Witness, educator, former Sonderkommando
- Organization: Auschwitz-Birkenau State Museum (Board Member)
- Known for: Survivor of Auschwitz-Birkenau

Henryk Mandelbaum (15 December 1922 – 17 June 2008) was a Polish Holocaust survivor. He was one of the prisoners in the Sonderkommando KL Auschwitz-Birkenau in the Auschwitz-Birkenau concentration camp who worked in the crematory. Only 110 out of 2,000 Sonderkommandos in Auschwitz-Birkenau survived the war. As of the death of Dario Gabbai in 2020, no former Auschwitz-Birkenau Sonderkommandos are known to be alive.

Mandelbaum was imprisoned as a Polish Jew at the age of 21 years. He fled from the Sosnowiec Ghetto and was reimprisoned on 22 April 1944, in Birkenau.

== Auschwitz ==
After arriving to Auschwitz, Mandelbaum was designated to forced labour in the crematory. He had to carry the corpses of the people who were gassed with Zyklon B, check body orifices for valuables and break out dental gold. In 1944 the capacity of the crematoriums was too small to burn all the corpses of prisoners killed. According to Mandelbaums witness testimony, Mandelbaum and others had to dig two huge pits, then burn the dead bodies in them. To improve the process they had to pour back the body fat, which was collected in small holes in the pit, over the top of the pile. Mandelbaum claimed the Germans wanted to not just burn the bodies but see them "fry".

Mandelbaum participated in the rebellion of inmates on 7 October 1944, which was put down quickly by the SS. One Oberkapo and 3 members of the SS were killed in the revolt (about a dozen SS were injured). Afterwards, 451 of the inmates were shot or hanged. This was the third rebellion in a camp after Treblinka (2 August 1943) and Sobibor (14 October 1943).

On a death march from Auschwitz to Loslau in January 1945, he was able to flee. He escaped wearing civilian clothes and hid on a farm for three weeks. After the liberation of Auschwitz he identified himself to the Wahrheitsfindungskommission (fact-finding commission) as an eyewitness.

Mandelbaum continued to live in Poland until his death and still carried the number 181970 on his left forearm. He often travelled to the former Nazi concentration camp of Auschwitz and to Germany to speak about his experiences. He said that young people especially should learn what happened in Auschwitz-Birkenau in 1945: "Man muss das doch alles wissen, man muss doch wissen, wie lange die Leute in den Gaskammern gewesen sind. Man muss wissen, wie lange sie gebrannt haben in den Öfen" ("People need to know, they really need to know, just how long the people were in the gas chambers. People need to know how long they burned in the ovens"). He sat as chair of the Auschwitz Museum directors and was keenly involved in publicising Auschwitz.

After the war, he was an officer of the Poviat Office for Public Security (UB) in Będzin in 1945-48.

He died on 17 June 2008 in the Polish city of Bytom, following heart surgery.

== Films ==
- Eric Friedler: Sklaven der Gaskammer - Das Jüdische Sonderkommando in Auschwitz, 2000, 44 min (in German)
- Stanislav Motl: Živý mrtvý - Live dead, 2008, 63 min (in Czech)

== Books ==
- Sonder. An Interview with Sonderkommando Member Henryk Mandelbaum, Jan Południak, Oświęcim, 2008, ISBN 978-83-921567-3-4.
