= Dario Gabbai =

Greek Holocaust survivor (1922–2020)

- Born: September 2, 1922; Thessaloniki, Kingdom of Greece
- Died: March 25, 2020 (aged 97); Los Angeles, California, U.S.

David Dario Gabbai (September 2, 1922 – March 25, 2020) was a Greek-Italian Sephardi Jew and Holocaust survivor, notable for his role as a member of the Sonderkommando at Auschwitz. He was deported to the camp in March 1944 and put to work in one of the crematoria at Birkenau, where he was forced to assist in burning the bodies of hundreds of thousands of Hungarian Jews that were deported to the camp during the spring and summer of that year.

Gabbai remained at Auschwitz until its evacuation in January 1945. He was liberated from Ebensee concentration camp in Austria by the United States Army, and spoke publicly about what he witnessed and experienced during the Holocaust. He was the last of the known survivors of the Sonderkommando.

== Deportation ==
Gabbai was born in Thessaloniki to a Greek mother and an Italian father and was educated in Italian schools in Greece. At the age of 21 years old, Gabbai and his entire family were detained by the Nazis on March 24, 1944, and on April 1 they were sent to Auschwitz in cattle wagons. Ten days later, this transport arrived at the Judenrampe outside Auschwitz-Birkenau, where they faced the selection process. Except for Gabbai himself, his brother, and two of his cousins (brothers Maurice and Shlomo Venezia), the entire family were selected for extermination and gassed that day. Gabbai watched his parents being loaded onto the trucks that would take them to the gas chambers and crematoria.

Gabbai was registered into the camp as prisoner 182568. He and the three other young men were selected to be Sonderkommandos and quarantined in Block 13 (known as the Sonderkommando-Block) in the men's camp of Birkenau for approximately one month.

== Sonderkommando work ==
Gabbai was taken to Crematorium II. As a member of the Sonderkommando, he found himself the closest to the extermination process and states to be one of 35 Greek men selected for that role, and was with his cousins and brother the whole time.

Gabbai's duties included helping the men, women, and children selected for gassing to get undressed, moving their dead bodies out of the gas chamber onto an electric lift which would bring them up to the ground floor where the ovens were located, and loading the bodies into the oven portals. While helping those selected to get undressed, one of the Sonderkommando members' duties was to maintain the pretence that they would merely be showered. Gabbai said that there were instances where the victims knew that something was suspicious about their fate, that "something funny was going on", but nothing could be done. In one instance, Gabbai recognized two of his friends from Thessaloniki, explained to them the reality of what was going to happen and told them where to stand in the gas chamber so that they would be killed as quickly as possible. Gabbai heard children and their mothers crying and scratching the walls of the gas chamber as they died. Once the killing was over, the ventilation system extracted the gas, and then the door would be opened. Gabbai says that:

"When they opened the door...I see these people that half an hour before were going [into the gas chamber], I see them all standing up, some black and blue from the gas. No place where to go. Dead. If I close my eyes, the only thing I see is standing up, women with children in their hands."

The operation to remove the bodies would then begin. Gabbai was given a pair of scissors and ordered to cut the hair off the women. Gabbai said he wailed "Where is God?" when cutting one woman's hair, as a sound emerged from her dead lips when he placed his foot on her belly. Gabbai and other Sonderkommando members would have to drag the bodies out of the gas chamber to the lift with a hooked cane. Once gas chamber was empty, they would then wash it down with water hoses, as the floor and walls would be covered in blood and excrement. He would also have to turn the bodies in the oven portals to ensure they burned evenly and grind up the bones that would not disintegrate from cremation.

== Evacuation ==
Gabbai was a Sonderkommando member for eight and a half months, during which time he and the 950 other Sonderkommando members burned the bodies of the 600,000 gassed Jews that also arrived in that time, most of them Hungarian. On January 18, 1945, the SS evacuated Auschwitz, and the few thousand inmates that could walk were filed out of the camp on a death march. Gabbai states that it was snowing and the temperature was −23 °C (−9 °F), and that many died en route; in addition, those who could no longer keep up would be shot. Gabbai says he survived the cold with verbal affirmations; closing his eyes and repeating "beautiful Athens in the sunshine" to himself. Gabbai and other prisoners were eventually put into open rail cars, and arrived in Austria, where Gabbai was forced to work excavating tunnels. He was also made a prisoner at Ebensee concentration camp, from which he was liberated by the U.S. 80th Infantry Division on May 6, 1945.

== Post-war ==
At the end of the war, Gabbai was one of around 90 surviving Auschwitz Sonderkommando members. He moved to the United States under the sponsorship of the Jewish community in Cleveland, and in 1951, relocated to California. Gabbai's retirement life consisted of visiting the gym daily, which he described as therapeutic: "When I'm sweating, everything goes away...my problems are over." He has compared the "lingering pain of what happened at Auschwitz to a virus that lies dormant [in him] until something triggers it", and said that there were moments when his Sonderkommando cohorts would have preferred to die, but then reconsidered, knowing that if they survived they would be able to tell the world what they witnessed. He has been described as a survivor who "combines incredible strength with a vulnerability and fragility that become apparent when he bears witness."

Gabbai features throughout "Auschwitz - The Final Witnesses", a 2000 film made by Sky for Channel 5 which reunited him with his two Sonderkommando cousins as they revisited the death camp together for the first time in over 50 years; Auschwitz: The Nazis and the 'Final Solution', a 2005 BBC six-episode documentary film series, and also makes an appearance in the 1998 Steven Spielberg Holocaust documentary, "The Last Days".

Gabbai was also featured in a 2010 documentary film, Finding Nico, about the Greek-American actor, Nico Minardos. Gabbai and Minardos met while emigrating from Greece to the States after the war and became close friends and roommates in Los Angeles in the 1950s. Gabbai was reunited with Minardos while attending a special screening of the documentary at the Motion Picture & Television Country House and Hospital, where Minardos was convalescing after a stroke.

Gabbai died on March 25, 2020, in Los Angeles, at the age of 97.

== See also ==
- Sonderkommando
- Morris Venezia
- Shlomo Venezia
- History of the Jews in Thessaloniki

== Bibliography ==
- Bertagnoli, Nicoletta (2007). Schweigen und Reden einer Generation: Erinnerungsgespräche mit Opfern, Tätern und Mitläufern des Nationalsozialismus. Mandelbaum. ISBN 978-3-85476-242-3
- Petropoulos, Jonathan; Roth, John K. (2007). Gray zones: ambiguity and compromise in the Holocaust and its aftermath. Berghahn Books. ISBN 978-1-84545-302-2
- Rees, Laurence (2005). Auschwitz: the Nazis & the 'final solution'. London: BBC Books. ISBN 0-563-52117-1. OCLC 57541764.
