= List of Holocaust survivors =

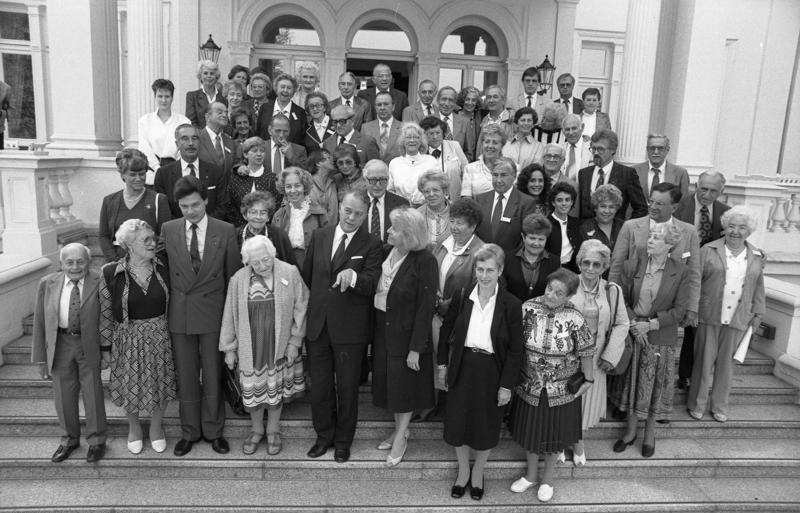
A group of Holocaust survivors being met by Ernst Albrecht in Bonn

The people on this list are or were survivors of Nazi Germany's attempt to exterminate the Jewish people in Europe before and during World War II in the Holocaust. A state-enforced persecution of Jewish people in Nazi-controlled Europe lasted from the introduction of the Nuremberg Laws in 1935 to Hitler's defeat in 1945. Although there were many victims of the Holocaust, the International Commission on Holocaust Era Insurance Claims (ICHEIC) defines a Holocaust survivor as, "Any Jew who lived for any period of time in a country that was ruled by the Nazis or their allies." The United States Holocaust Memorial Museum (USHMM) gives a broader definition: "The Museum honors as a survivor any person who was displaced, persecuted, and/or discriminated against by the racial, religious, ethnic, social, and/or political policies of the Nazis and their allies between 1933 and 1945. In addition to former inmates of concentration camps and ghettos, this includes refugees and people in hiding." Most notably, as well as Jewish people, this includes Poles, Romani people, Jehovah's Witnesses and those who were persecuted for political reasons such as Communists, those who were persecuted for religious reasons (such as Pastor Niemöller), and homosexuals and those of other sexual orientations. It includes those who were actually in hiding in Nazi-occupied countries. The latter includes Hidden Children, who were hidden to escape the Nazis.

Most especially, in contrast to the ICHEIC definition, it includes refugees, who fled from their homeland to escape the Nazis, and never lived in a Nazi-controlled country.

The ICHEIC definition was created for the purpose of resolving some insurance claims. Over time, the classes of insurance claims have greatly expanded.

This list does not include refugees, since it is created on the basis of the restricted ICHEIC definition. Refugees include the unaccompanied children of the Kindertransport and the unaccompanied One Thousand Children.

== Actors, actresses and directors ==
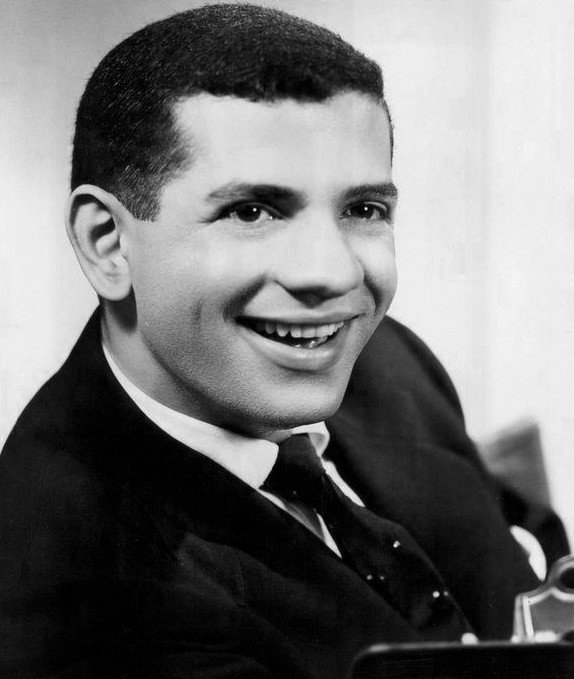
Robert Clary in 1953

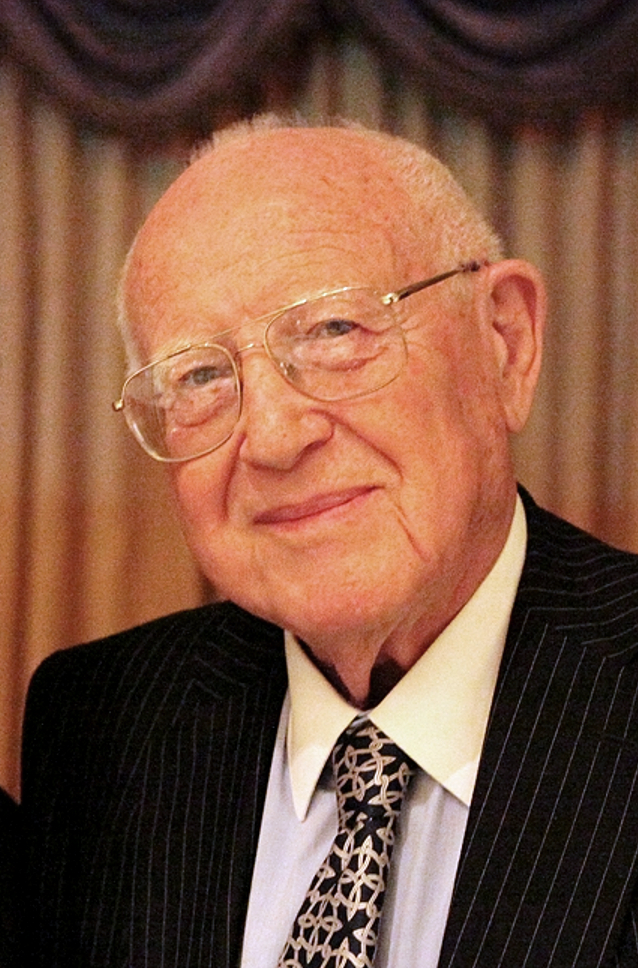
Branko Lustig in 2009

=== Living ===
Name	Sex	Birth	Country
Polanski, Roman	M	August 18, 1933 (age 93)	Poland/France

=== Deceased ===
Name	Sex	Birth	Death (age)	Country
Clary, Robert	M	March 1, 1926	November 16, 2022 (aged 96)	France
Huber, Lotti	F	October 16, 1912	May 31, 1998 (aged 85)	Germany
Langhoff, Wolfgang	M	October 6, 1901	August 26, 1966 (aged 64)	Germany
Le Beau, Bettina	F	March 23, 1935	May 21, 1998 (aged 63)	Belgium
Lowens, Curt	M	November 17, 1925	May 8, 2017 (aged 91)	Poland
Lustig, Branko	M	June 10, 1932	November 14, 2019 (aged 87)	Croatia
Pitt, Ingrid	F	November 21, 1937	November 23, 2010 (aged 73)	Poland
Posner, Ruth	F	April 20, 1929	September 26, 2025 (aged 96)	Poland
Pravda, Hana Maria	F	January 29, 1916	May 22, 2008 (aged 92)	Czechoslovakia
Regnier, Charles	M	July 22, 1914	September 13, 2001 (aged 87)	Germany
Sernas, Jacques	M	July 30, 1925	July 3, 2015 (aged 89)	Lithuania
Von Ruffin, Kurt	M	September 28, 1901	November 17, 1996 (aged 95)	Germany

== Artists, painters, and photographers ==
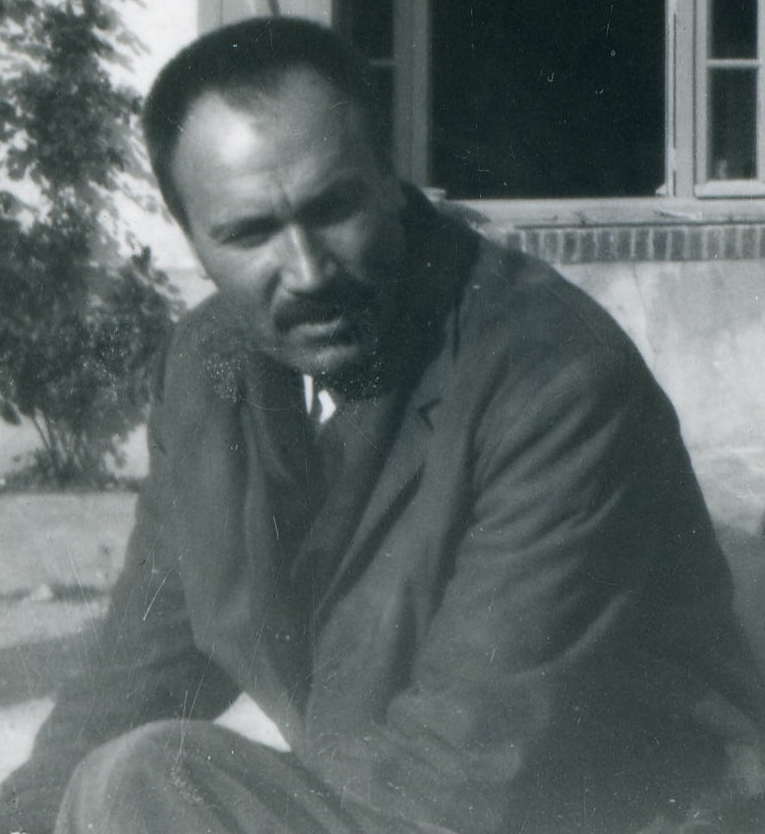
Zoran Mušič in the 1960s

=== Living ===
Name	Sex	Birth	Country
Bacon, Yehuda	M	July 28, 1929 (age 97)	Czech Republic
Bak, Samuel	M	August 12, 1933 (age 93)	Poland
Berman, Helen	F	April 6, 1936 (age 90)	Netherlands
Selinger, Shelomo	M	May 31, 1928 (age 98)	Poland/France

=== Deceased ===
Name	Sex	Birth	Death (age)	Country
Aron, Kalman	M	September 14, 1924	February 24, 2018 (aged 93)	Latvia
Babbitt, Dina	F	January 21, 1923	July 29, 2009 (aged 86)	Czechoslovakia
Breger, Helen	F	1918	October 22, 2013 (aged 94–95)	Austria
Bullaty, Sonja	F	October 17, 1923	October 5, 2000 (aged 76)	Czechoslovakia
Burešová, Charlotta	F	November 4, 1904	1983 (aged 78–79)	Czechoslovakia
Koczy, Rosemarie	F	March 5, 1939	December 12, 2007 (aged 68)	Poland
Lieblich, Irene	F	April 20, 1923	December 28, 2008 (aged 85)	Poland
Lok Cahana, Alice	F	February 7, 1929	November 28, 2017 (aged 88)	Hungary
Michelson, Frida	F	1929	1982 (aged 52–53)	Latvia/Israel
Mušič, Zoran	M	February 12, 1909	May 25, 2005 (aged 96)	Slovenia/Yugoslavia
Nassy, Josef	M	January 19, 1904	1976 (aged 71–72)	Belgium/Netherlands/Suriname
Olère, David	M	January 19, 1902	August 21, 1985 (aged 83)	Poland
Szapocznikow, Alina	F	May 16, 1926	March 2, 1973 (aged 46)	Poland
Tarkay, Itzchak	M	1935	June 3, 2012 (aged 76–77)	Serbia/Yugoslavia
Terna, Fred	M	8 October 1923	December 8, 2022 (aged 99)	Czechoslovakia
Tibor, Alfred	M	February 10, 1920	March 18, 2017 (aged 97)	Hungary

== Humanities ==
=== Living ===
Name	Sex	Birth(age)	Country
Hershaft, Alex	M	July 1, 1934 (age 92)	Poland

=== Deceased ===
Name	Sex	Birth	Death (age)	Country
Aran, Lydia	F	October 1921	5 March 2013 (aged 91)	Lithuania
Bäumer, Angelica	F	January 13, 1932	July 18, 2025 (aged 93)	Austria
Bettelheim, Bruno	M	August 28, 1903	March 13, 1990 (aged 86)	Austria
Buergenthal, Thomas	M	May 11, 1934	May 29, 2023 (aged 89)	Czechoslovakia
Fackenheim, Emil	M	June 22, 1916	September 18, 2003 (aged 87)	Germany
Feuerwerker, Antoinette	F	November 24, 1912	February 10, 2003 (aged 90)	Belgium
Klüger, Ruth	F	October 30, 1931	October 6, 2020 (aged 88)	Austria
Sendler, Irena	F	February 15, 1910	May 12, 2008 (aged 98)	Poland
Szondi, Péter	M	May 27, 1929	October 18, 1971 (aged 42)	Hungary
Wahl, Jean	M	May 25, 1888	June 19, 1974 (aged 86)	France

== Literature, memoirs and publishing ==
=== Living ===
Name	Sex	Birth (age)	Country
Auerbacher, Inge	F	December 31, 1934 (age 91)	Germany
Begley, Louis	M	October 6, 1933 (age 93)	Ukraine/USSR
Birenbaum, Halina	F	September 15, 1929 (age 97)	Poland
Boraks-Nemetz, Lillian	F	1933 (age 92-93)	Poland
Blitz Konig, Nanette	F	April 6, 1929 (age 97)	Netherlands
Blumenthal, Ella	F	July 25, 1921 (age 105)	Poland
Bolle-Levie, Mirjam	F	March 20, 1917 (age 109)	Netherlands
Bruck, Edith	F	May 3, 1931 (age 95)	Hungary
Hersh, Arek	M	September 13, 1928 (age 98)	Poland
Levitin, Sonia	F	August 18, 1934 (age 92)	Germany
Lobel, Anita	F	June 2, 1934 (age 92)	Poland
Zisblatt, Irene	F	December 28, 1929 (age 96)	Hungary

=== Deceased ===
Name	Sex	Birth	Death (age)	Country
Abraham, Ben	M	December 11, 1924	October 9, 2015 (aged 90)	Poland
Roma, Rothstein	F	June 2, 1926	January, 2022 (aged 95)	Poland
Adler, H. G.	M	July 2, 1910	August 21, 1988 (aged 78)	Czechoslovakia
Albreht, Fran	M	November 17, 1889	November 2, 1963 (aged 73)	Slovenia
Albreht, Vera	F	February 11, 1895	May 25, 1971 (aged 76)	Slovenia
Améry, Jean	M	October 31, 1912	October 17, 1978 (aged 65)	Austria
Appleman-Jurman, Alicia	F	May 9, 1930	April 8, 2017 (aged 86)	Poland
Arendt, Hannah	F	October 14, 1906	April 12, 1975 (aged 68)	Germany
Auerbakh, Rokhl	F	December 18, 1903	May 31, 1976 (aged 72)	Poland
d'Ayen, Solange	F	April 5, 1898	November 3, 1976 (aged 78)	France
Balas, Edith	F	June 20, 1929	November 16, 2024 (aged 95)	Romania
Beck, Gad	M	June 30, 1923	June 24, 2012 (aged 88)	Germany
Blatt, Thomas	M	April 15, 1927	October 31, 2015 (aged 88)	Poland
Blumenthal-Weiss, Ilse	F	October 14, 1899	August 10, 1987 (aged 87)	Germany
Boom, Cornelia "Corrie" ten	F	April 15, 1892	April 15, 1983 (aged 91)	Netherlands
Borowski, Tadeusz	M	November 12, 1922	July 1, 1951 (aged 28)	Ukraine/USSR
Brady, George	M	February 9, 1928	January 11, 2019 (aged 90)	Czechoslovakia
Bretholz, Leo	M	March 6, 1921	March 8, 2014 (aged 93)	Austria
Celan, Paul	M	November 23, 1920	April 20, 1970 (aged 49)	Romania
Chillag, John	M	April 20, 1927	March 21, 2009 (aged 81)	Austria
Clare, George	M	December 21, 1920	March 26, 2009 (aged 88)	Great Britain
Cohn, Marthe	F	April 13, 1920	May 21, 2025 (aged 105)	France
Dagan, Bat-Sheva	F	September 8, 1925	January 25, 2024 (aged 98)	Poland
Debreczeni, József	M	October 13, 1905	April 26, 1978 (aged 72)	Hungary
De-Nur, Yehiel	M	May 16, 1909	July 17, 2001 (aged 92)	Poland
Delbo, Charlotte	F	August 10, 1913	March 1, 1985 (aged 71)	France
Deutschkron, Inge	F	August 23, 1922	March 9, 2022 (aged 99)	Germany
Ebert, Lily	F	December 29, 1923	October 9, 2024 (aged 100)	Hungary
Edvardson, Cordelia	F	January 1, 1929	October 29, 2012 (aged 83)	Germany
Faber, David	M	August 25, 1928	July 28, 2015 (aged 86)	Poland
Feldhendler, Leon	M	June 1, 1910	April 6, 1945 (aged 34)	Poland
Fénelon, Fania	F	September 2, 1908	December 19, 1983 (aged 75)	France
Frank, Otto	M	May 12, 1889	August 19, 1980 (aged 91)	Germany
Frankl, Victor	M	March 26, 1905	August 2, 1997 (aged 92)	Austria
Friedberg, Bernard	M	December 19, 1876	January 27, 1961 (aged 84)	Austria
Friedenson, Joseph	M	April 1922	February 23, 2013 (aged 90)	Poland
Friedländer, Vera	F	February 27, 1928	October 25, 2019 (aged 91)	Germany
Frister, Roman	M	January 17, 1928	February 9, 2015 (aged 87)	Poland
Glazar, Richard	M	November 29, 1920	December 20, 1997 (aged 77)	Czechoslovakia
Golde, Henry	M	May 5, 1929	October 18, 2019 (aged 90)	Poland
Goldman, Yosef	M	1942	August 4, 2015 (aged 72–73)	Hungary
Gray, Martin	M	April 27, 1922	April 25, 2016 (aged 93)	Poland
Heller, Fanya	F	October 14, 1924	October 31, 2017 (aged 93)	Ukraine
Herzberger, Magda	F	February 20, 1926	April 23, 2021 (aged 95)	Romania
Heumann, Margot	F	February 17, 1928	May 11, 2022 (aged 94)	Germany
Hollander, Eugene	M	December 14, 1912	December 15, 1996 (aged 84)	Hungary
Jaku, Eddie	M	April 14, 1920	October 12, 2021 (aged 101)	Germany/Australia
Jaranyi, Elizabeth	F	February 19, 1918	February 26, 1998 (aged 80)	Hungary/United States
Jedwab-Rozenberg, Lena	F	November 30, 1924	February 15, 2005 (aged 80)	Poland/France
Kertész, Imre	M	November 9, 1929	March 31, 2016 (aged 86)	Hungary
Klein, Gerda	F	May 8, 1924	April 3, 2022 (aged 97)	Poland
Klemperer, Victor	M	October 9, 1889	February 11, 1960 (aged 70)	Germany
Klíma, Ivan	M	September 14, 1931	October 4, 2025 (aged 94)	Czechoslovakia
Komski, Jan	M	February 3, 1915	July 20, 2002 (aged 87)	Poland
Kosinski, Jerzy	M	June 14, 1933	May 3, 1991 (aged 57)	Poland
Kralj, Vladimir	M	August 16, 1901	March 29, 1969 (aged 67)	Slovenia/Yugoslavia
Lengyel, Olga	F	October 19, 1908	April 15, 2001 (aged 92)	Romania
Levi, Primo	M	July 31, 1919	April 11, 1987 (aged 67)	Italy
Leyson, Leon	M	September 15, 1929	January 12, 2013 (aged 83)	Poland
Lustig, Arnošt	M	December 21, 1926	February 26, 2011 (aged 84)	Czechoslovakia
Mannheimer, Max	M	February 6, 1920	September 24, 2016 (aged 96)	Czechoslovakia
Maxwell, Robert	M	June 10, 1923	November 5, 1991 (aged 68)	Czechoslovakia
Müller, Filip	M	January 3, 1922	November 9, 2013 (aged 91)	Czechoslovakia
Orenstein, Henry	M	October 13, 1923	December 14, 2021 (aged 98)	Poland
Örkény, István	M	April 5, 1912	June 24, 1979 (aged 67)	Hungary
Øverland, Arnulf	M	April 27, 1889	March 25, 1968 (aged 78)	Norway
Pagis, Dan	M	October 16, 1930	July 29, 1986 (aged 55)	Romania
Pahor, Boris	M	August 26, 1913	May 30, 2022 (aged 108)	Slovenia/Italy
Pick-Goslar, Hannah	F	November 12, 1928	October 28, 2022 (aged 93)	Netherlands
Półtawska, Wanda	F	November 2, 1921	October 24, 2023 (aged 101)	Poland
Prežihov, Voranc	M	August 10, 1893	February 18, 1950 (aged 56)	Slovenia/Yugoslavia
Rabinovici, Schoschana	F	November 14, 1932	August 2, 2019 (aged 86)	France
Radasky, Solomon	M	May 17, 1910	August 4, 2002 (aged 92)	Poland
Reich-Ranicki, Marcel	M	June 2, 1920	September 18, 2013 (aged 93)	Germany
Roth, Emerich	M	August 28, 1924	January 22, 2022 (aged 97)	Czechoslovakia
Sachs, Nelly	F	December 10, 1891	May 12, 1970 (aged 78)	Germany
Salier, Eva	F	1923	August 12, 2014 (aged 91)	Germany
Schloss, Eva	F	May 11, 1929	January 3, 2026 (aged 96)	Austria
Semprún, Jorge	M	December 10, 1923	June 7, 2011 (aged 87)	Spain
Sobolewicz, Tadeusz	M	March 25, 1925	October 28, 2015 (aged 90)	Poland
Spiegelman, Vladek	M	October 11, 1906	August 18, 1982 (aged 75)	Poland
Staner, Mieczysław	M	1924	August 29, 2003 (aged 78–79)	Poland
Torkar, Igor	M	October 13, 1913	January 1, 2004 (aged 90)	Slovenia
Wachstein, Sonia	F	October 25, 1907	August 10, 2001 (aged 93)	Austria
Winter, Miriam	F	June 2, 1933	July 19, 2014 (aged 81)	Poland
Zoltan-Zinn, Collis	M	1940	December 10, 2012 (aged 71–72)	Czechoslovakia
Zsolt, Béla	M	August 1, 1895	June 2, 1949 (aged 53)	Hungary

== Mathematics and natural sciences ==
=== Living ===
Names	Sex	Birth (age)	Country
Hoffmann, Roald	M	July 13, 1937 (age 89)	Poland
Reisfeld, Renata	F	1930 (age 95–96)	Poland
Wilchek, Meir	M	October 17, 1935 (age 90)	Poland

=== Deceased ===
Name	Sex	Birth (age)	Death (age)	Country
Adelsberger, Lucie	F	April 12, 1895	November 2, 1971 (aged 76)	Germany
Anders, Edward	M	June 21, 1926	June 1, 2025 (aged 98)	Latvia/United States
Butter, Irene	F	December 11, 1930	October 2, 2026 (aged 95)	Germany/United States
Charpak, Georges	M	August 1, 1924	September 29, 2010 (aged 86)	France
Eitinger, Leo	M	December 12, 1912	October 15, 1996 (aged 83)	Norway
Englert, François	M	November 6, 1932	June 18, 2026 (aged 93)	Belgium
Frank, Otto	M	May 12, 1889	August 19, 1980 (aged 91)	Germany
Goldschmidt, Victor	M	January 27, 1888	March 20, 1947 (aged 59)	Switzerland
Grothendieck, Alexander	M	March 28, 1928	November 13, 2014 (aged 86)	Germany
Heilman, Anna	F	December 1, 1928	May 1, 2011 (aged 83)	Poland
Kahneman, Daniel	M	March 5, 1934	March 27, 2024 (aged 90)	France
Kohn, Walter	M	March 9, 1923	April 19, 2016 (aged 93)	Austria
Lipschutz Yevick, Miriam	F	August 28, 1924	September 5, 2016 (aged 92)	Belgium
Levi-Montalcini, Rita	F	April 22, 1909	December 30, 2012 (aged 103)	Italy
Librescu, Liviu	M	August 18, 1930	April 16, 2007 (aged 76)	Romania
Mandel, Ernest	M	April 5, 1923	July 20, 1995 (aged 72)	Germany
Morgentaler, Henry	M	March 19, 1923	May 29, 2013 (aged 90)	Poland
Nussbaum, A. Edward	M	January 10, 1925	October 31, 2009 (aged 84)	Germany
Philippson, Alfred	M	January 1, 1864	January 30, 1953 (aged 89)	Germany
Reichental, Tomi	M	June 1935	May 2026 (aged 90)	Czechoslovakia
Shahak, Israel	M	April 28, 1933	July 2, 2001 (aged 68)	Poland
Ślebodziński, Władysław	M	February 6, 1884	January 3, 1972 (aged 87)	Poland
Tanay, Emanuel	M	March 5, 1928	August 5, 2014 (aged 86)	Poland
Touschek, Bruno	M	February 3, 1921	May 25, 1978 (aged 57)	Austria
Trachtenberg, Jakow	M	June 17, 1888	October 26, 1951 (aged 63)	Russia, USSR
Turán, Pál	M	August 18, 1910	September 26, 1976 (aged 66)	Hungary
Warfman, Rose	F	October 4, 1916	September 17, 2016 (aged 99)	Switzerland

== Military ==
=== Deceased ===
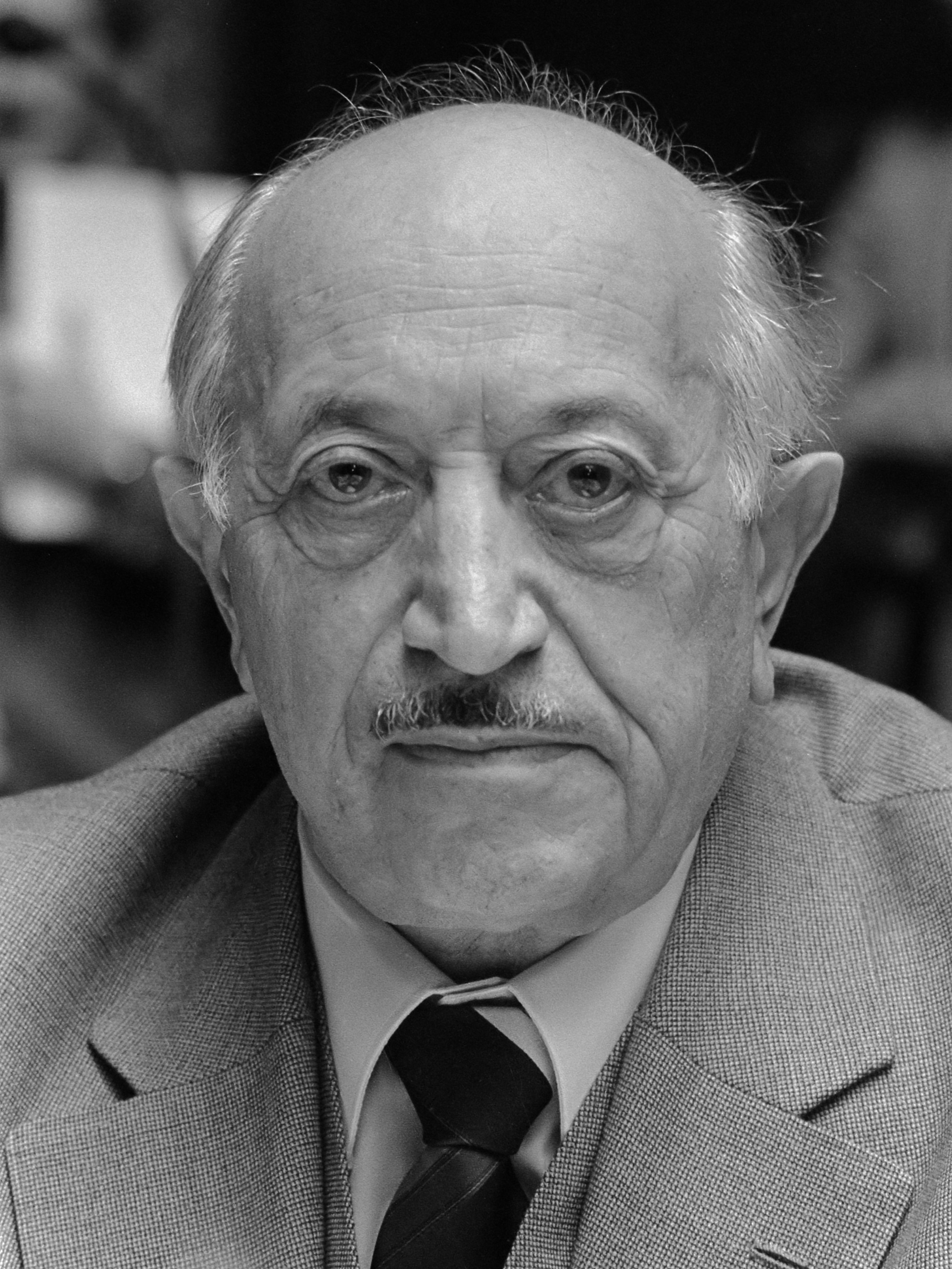
Simon Wiesenthal

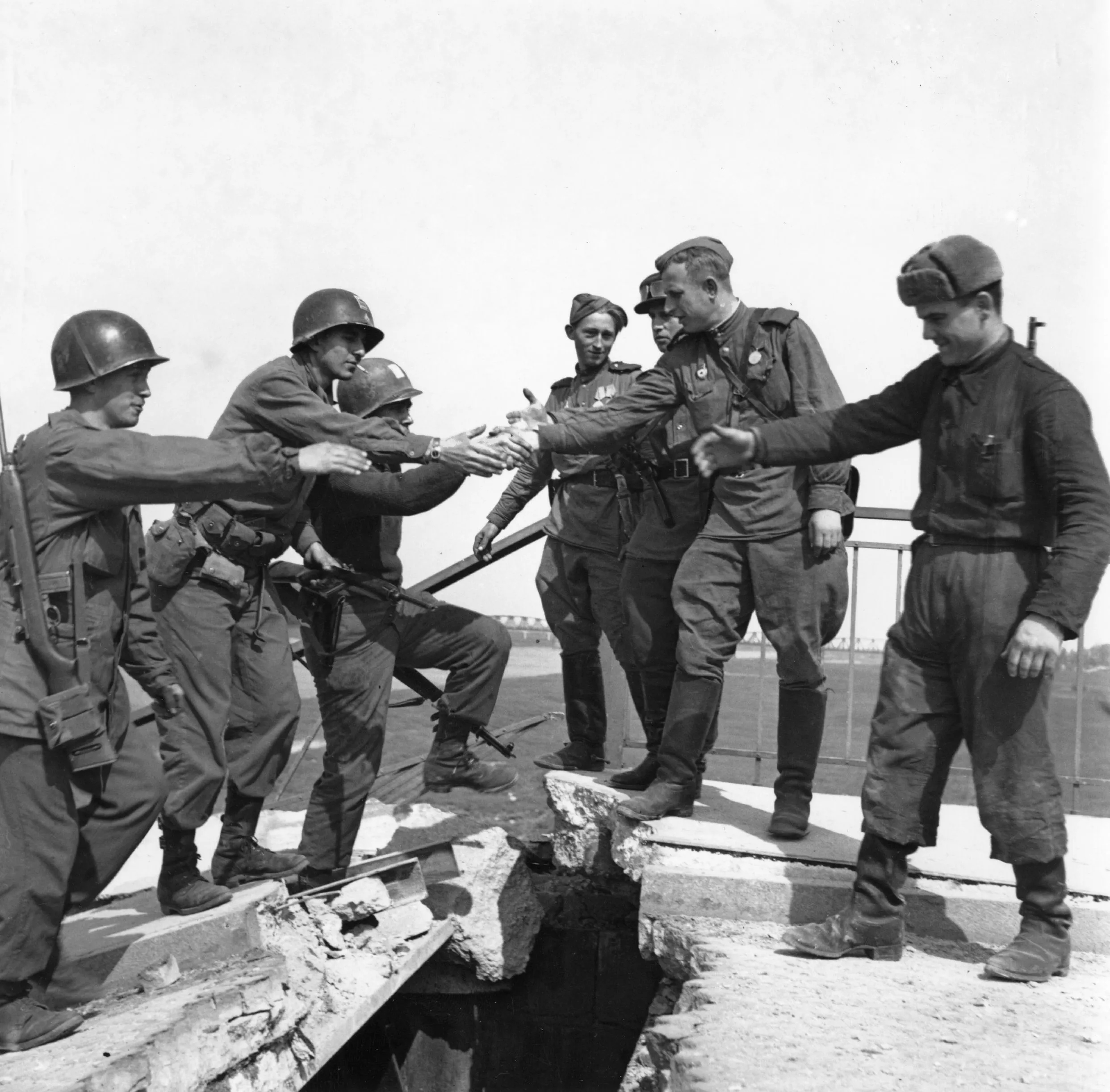
Lt Thau, Center, Meeting Americans (Image Source: WikiCommons)

Name	Sex	Birth	Death (age)	Country
Acevedo, Anthony	M	July 31, 1924	February 11, 2018 (aged 93)	United States
Egge, Bjørn	M	August 19, 1918	July 25, 2007 (aged 88)	Norway
Friedman, Tuviah	M	January 23, 1922	January 13, 2011 (aged 88)	Poland
Kowalski, Józef	M	February 2, 1900	December 7, 2013 (aged 113)	Poland
Pechersky, Alexander	M	February 22, 1909	January 19, 1990 (aged 80)	Ukraine, USSR
Pilecki, Witold	M	May 13, 1901	May 25, 1948 (aged 47)	Poland
Rosenfeld, Simjon	M	October 1, 1922	June 3, 2019 (aged 96)	USSR
Rubin, Tibor	M	June 18, 1929	December 5, 2015 (aged 86)	Hungary
Shaltiel, David	M	January 16, 1903	1969 (aged 65–66)	Germany
Thau, Charles	M	July 7, 1921	April 2, 1995 (aged 73)	Poland
Wiesenthal, Simon	M	December 31, 1908	September 20, 2005 (aged 96)	Austria
Willner, Eddie	M	August 15, 1926	March 30, 2008 (aged 81)	Germany

== Music ==
=== Living ===
Name	Sex	Birth (age)	Country
Ben-Or, Nelly	F	1933 (age 92–93)	Poland
Lasker-Wallfisch, Anita	F	July 17, 1925 (age 101)	Germany

=== Deceased ===
Name	Sex	Birth	Death (age)	Country
Ančerl, Karel	M	April 11, 1908	July 3, 1973 (aged 65)	Czechoslovakia
Arnič, Blaž	M	January 31, 1901	February 1, 1970 (aged 69)	Slovenia
Béjarano, Esther	F	December 15, 1924	July 10, 2021 (aged 96)	Germany
Carmeli, Boris	M	April 23, 1928	July 31, 2009 (aged 81)	Poland
Fénelon, Fania	F	September 2, 1908	December 19, 1983 (aged 75)	France
Filar, Marian	M	December 17, 1917	July 10, 2012 (aged 94)	Poland
Graham, Bill	M	January 8, 1931	October 25, 1991 (aged 60)	Germany
Herz-Sommer, Alice	F	November 26, 1903	February 23, 2014 (aged 110)	Czechoslovakia
Karp, Natalia	F	February 27, 1911	July 9, 2007 (aged 96)	Poland
Reiner, Karel	M	June 27, 1910	October 17, 1979 (aged 69)	Czechoslovakia
Roman, Martin	M	April 23, 1910	May 12, 1996 (aged 86)	Germany
Růžičková, Zuzana	F	January 14, 1927	September 27, 2017 (aged 90)	Czechoslovakia
Schreyer, Alfred	M	May 8, 1922	April 25, 2015 (aged 92)	Ukraine
Schumann, Heinz Jakob "Coco"	M	May 14, 1924	January 28, 2018 (aged 93)	Germany
Szpilman, Władysław	M	December 5, 1911	July 6, 2000 (aged 88)	Poland
Vogel, Eric	M	1896	1980 (aged 83–84)	Czechoslovakia

== Politics, activism, resistance ==
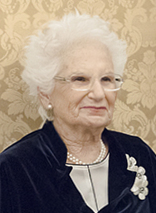
Liliana Segre

=== Living ===
Names	Sex	Birth (age)	Country
Levy, Anne Skorecki	F	July 1935 (age 91)	Poland
Schwab, George David	M	November 25, 1931 (age 94)	Latvia/United States
Segre, Liliana	F	September 10, 1930 (age 96)	Italy
Zylbersztajn-Tzur, Stella	F	November 29, 1925 (age 100)	Poland

=== Deceased ===
Name	Sex	Birth (age)	Death (age)	Country
Kozak, Marion	F	December 22, 1934	May 27, 2026 (aged 91)	Poland/United Kingdom
Bartoszewski, Władysław	M	February 19, 1922	April 24, 2015 (aged 93)	Poland
Blum, Léon	M	April 9, 1872	March 3, 1950 (aged 77)	France
Bratteli, Trygve	M	January 11, 1910	November 20, 1984 (aged 74)	Norway
Burack, Zahava	F	December 14, 1932	September 28, 2001 (aged 68)	Poland
Cyrankiewicz, Józef	M	April 23, 1911	January 20, 1989 (aged 77)	Poland
Draxler, Ludwig	M	1896	1972 (aged 75–76)	Austria
Epstein, Hedy	F	August 15, 1924	May 26, 2016 (aged 91)	Germany/United States
Geremek, Bronisław	M	March 6, 1932	July 13, 2008 (aged 76)	Poland
Gerhardsen, Einar	M	May 10, 1897	September 19, 1987 (aged 90)	Norway
Goldman, Alter Mojze	M	November 17, 1909	January 1, 1988 (aged 78)	Poland, France
Heilman, Anna	F	December 1, 1928	May 1, 2011 (aged 82)	Poland
Kossak-Szczucka, Zofia	F	August 10, 1889	April 9, 1968 (aged 78)	Poland
Lantos, Tom	M	February 1, 1928	February 11, 2008 (aged 80)	Hungary
Nansen, Odd	M	December 6, 1901	June 27, 1973 (aged 71)	Norway
Nielsen, Martin	M	December 12, 1900	1962 (aged 61–62)	Denmark
Rogerie, André	M	December 25, 1921	May 1, 2014 (aged 92)	France
Rubin, Anatoly	M	January 29, 1927	January 16, 2017 (aged 89)	USSR, Israel
Schumacher, Kurt	M	October 13, 1895	August 20, 1952 (aged 56)	Germany
Šik, Ota	M	September 11, 1919	August 22, 2004 (aged 84)	Czechoslovakia
Srebrnik, Simon	M	April 10, 1930	August 16, 2006 (aged 76)	Poland
Veil, Simone	F	July 13, 1927	June 30, 2017 (aged 89)	France
Vrba, Rudolf	M	November 9, 1924	March 27, 2006 (aged 81)	Czechoslovakia
Weiss, Shevah	M	July 5, 1935	February 3, 2023 (aged 87)	Poland
Wetzler, Alfréd	M	May 10, 1918	February 8, 1988 (aged 69)	Czechoslovakia

== Speakers and researchers of the Holocaust ==
=== Living ===
Name	Sex	Birth	Country
Baker, Else	F	December 18, 1935 (age 90)	Germany
Gutter, Pinchas	M	1932 (age 93–94)	Poland
Hart-Moxon, Kitty	F	December 1, 1926 (age 99)	Poland
Kolinka, Ginette	F	February 4, 1925 (age 101)	France
Klarsfeld, Serge	M	September 17, 1935 (age 91)	Romania
Leipciger, Nate	M	28 February 1928 (age 98)	Poland
Nussbaum, Laureen	F	August 3, 1927 (age 99)	Germany
Orosz-Richt, Angela	F	December 21, 1944 (age 81)	Hungary
Pollack, Susan	F	September 9, 1930 (age 96)	Hungary

=== Deceased ===
Name	Sex	Birth	Death (age)	Country
Ban, Noémi	F	September 29, 1922	June 7, 2019 (aged 96)	Hungary
Biterman, Tauba	F	September 10, 1917	November 11, 2019 (aged 102)	Poland
Engel-Wijnberg, Selma	F	May 15, 1922	December 4, 2018 (aged 96)	Netherlands
Evers-Emden, Bloeme	F	July 26, 1926	July 18, 2016 (aged 89)	Netherlands
Fainer, Ben	M	November 28, 1930	May 17, 2016 (aged 85)	Poland
Fischl, Peter	M	July 19, 1930	February 12, 2018 (aged 87)	Hungary
Foxman, Abraham	M	May 1, 1940	May 10, 2026 (aged 86)	Belarus/USSR
Frankenthal, Hans	M	July 15, 1926	December 22, 1999 (aged 73)	Germany
Friedländer, Margot	F	November 5, 1921	May 9, 2025 (aged 103)	Germany
Gelissen, Rena	F	August 24, 1920	April 8, 2006 (aged 85)	Poland
Ginsburg, Leon	M	June 12, 1932	March 10, 2014 (aged 81)	Poland/United States
Glauben, Max	M	January 14, 1928	April 28, 2022 (aged 94)	Poland/United States
Gorath, Karl	M	December 12, 1912	March 18, 2002 (aged 89)	Germany
Greenman, Leon	M	September 18, 1910	March 7, 2008 (aged 97)	Great Britain/Netherlands
Herskovic, William	M	June 1914	March 3, 2006 (aged 91)	Hungary
Kanitz, Miklos	M	1939	November 6, 2006 (aged 66–67)	Hungary
Kramer, Clara	F	April 9, 1927	September 11, 2018 (aged 91)	Poland
Mandelbaum, Henryk	M	December 15, 1922	June 17, 2008 (aged 85)	Poland
Mandelbaum, Jack	M	April 10, 1927	August 6, 2023 (aged 96)	Poland
Mosberg, Edward	M	January 6, 1926	September 21, 2022 (aged 96)	Poland
Nomberg-Przytyk, Sara	F	September 10, 1915	October 19, 1996 (aged 81)	Canada
Perel, Solomon	M	April 21, 1925	February 2, 2023 (aged 97)	Germany
Pfefferberg, Leopold	M	March 20, 1913	March 9, 2001 (aged 87)	Poland
Plywaski, Walter	M	August 10, 1929	January 28, 2021 (aged 91)	Poland
Riteman, Philip	M	February 14, 1922	August 8, 2018 (aged 96)	Poland
Rosensaft, Josef	M	January 15, 1911	September 11, 1975 (aged 64)	Poland
Rubin, Tibor	M	June 18, 1929	December 5, 2015 (aged 86)	Hungary
Schelvis, Jules	M	January 7, 1921	April 3, 2016 (aged 95)	Netherlands
Seel, Pierre	M	August 16, 1923	November 25, 2005 (aged 82)	France
Shipper, Zigi	M	January 18, 1930	January 18, 2023 (aged 93)	Poland
Spiegel, Paul	M	December 31, 1937	April 30, 2006 (aged 68)	Germany
Țucărman, Iancu	M	October 30, 1922	January 8, 2021 (aged 98)	Romania
Vestermanis, Marģers	M	September 18, 1925	July 30, 2026 (aged 100)	Latvian
Wiesel, Elie	M	September 30, 1928	July 2, 2016 (aged 87)	Romania
Wolanski, Sabina	F	June 8, 1927	June 23, 2011 (aged 84)	Poland

== Sports ==
=== Living ===
Name	Sex	Birth (age)	Country	Sport
Ladany, Shaul	M	April 2, 1936 (age 90)	Yugoslavia	Racewalking; 2-time Olympian. World record in 50-mile walk, Israeli national record in 50-kilometer walk. World champion in 100-kilometer walk. 5 Maccabiah Games gold medals.
Tausz Rónai, Nora	F	February 29, 1924 (age 102)	Italy, Brazil	Professor of descriptive geometry, began competing internationally as a Masters swimmer in 1993, has won 13 gold medals and has broken both national and regional records for her age group.

=== Deceased ===
Name	Sex	Birth	Death (age)	Country	Sport
Arouch, Salamo	M	January 1, 1923	April 26, 2009 (aged 86)	Greece & Israel	Boxing; the Middleweight Champion of Greece
Epstein, Kurt	M	January 21, 1904	February 1, 1975 (aged 71)	Czechoslovakia	Water polo; Olympic player (1928 and 1936)
Erbstein, Ernő Egri	M	May 13, 1898	May 4, 1949 (aged 50)	Hungary	Association football; Serie A champion as manager of Torino F.C (1948–49)
Guth, Alfred	M	July 27, 1908	November 13, 1996 (aged 88)	Austria/United States	American water polo player; swimmer; Olympic modern pentathlete
Helfgott, Ben	M	November 22, 1929	June 16, 2023 (aged 93)	Poland/Great Britain	Weightlifting; 3x British champion (lightweight) weightlifter, 3x Maccabiah champion
Keleti, Ágnes	F	January 9, 1921	January 2, 2025 (aged 103)	Hungary	Gymnastics
Kleinová, Gertrude "Traute"	F	August 13, 1918	February 1975 (aged 56–57)	Czechoslovakia	Table tennis; 3-time world champion
de Levie, Elka	F	November 21, 1905	December 12, 1979 (aged 74)	Netherlands	Gymnastics; Olympic champion (1928)
Nakache, Alfred "Artem"	M	November 18, 1915	1983 (aged 67–68)	France	Swimming; world record, one-third of French 2x world record
Sláma, Miroslav	M	August 3, 1917	November 30, 2008 (aged 91)	Czechoslovakia	Ice hockey; Olympic medalist (1948)

== Theology, spirituality, religion ==
=== Living ===
Name	Sex	Birth (age)	Country
Lau, Yisrael	M	June 1, 1937 (age 89)	Poland

=== Deceased ===
Name	Sex	Birth	Death (age)	Country
Avigdor, Yaakov	M	1896	1967 (aged 70–71)	Poland
Baeck, Leo	M	May 23, 1873	November 2, 1956 (aged 83)	Germany/United Kingdom
Engleitner, Leopold	M	July 23, 1905	April 21, 2013 (aged 107)	Austria
Feuerwerker, David	M	October 2, 1912	June 20, 1980 (aged 67)	Switzerland
Friediger, Max	M	April 9, 1884	1947 (aged 62–63)	Denmark
Gajowniczek, Franciszek	M	November 15, 1901	March 13, 1995 (aged 93)	Poland
Gold, Ben-Zion	M	1923	April 18, 2016 (aged 92–93)	Poland
Goldman, Chananya	M	1905	1982 (aged 76–77)	Hungary
Halberstam, Yekusiel Yehudah	M	January 10, 1905	June 18, 1994 (aged 89)	Poland
Kozłowiecki, Adam	M	April 1, 1911	September 28, 2007 (aged 96)	Poland
Liebman, Gershon	M	1905	March 8, 1997 (aged 91–92)	France
Lustiger, Jean-Marie	M	September 17, 1926	August 5, 2007 (aged 80)	France
Newmark, Helga	F	1932	2012 (aged 79–80)	Germany
Rosenbaum, Tibor	M	November 2, 1923	October 23, 1980 (aged 56)	Hungary/Switzerland
Rudolph, Richard	M	June 11, 1911	January 31, 2014 (aged 102)	Germany
Sobolewski, Sigmund	M	May 11, 1923	August 7, 2017 (aged 94)	Poland
Taub, Menachem	M	1923	April 28, 2019 (aged 95–96)	Poland
Teitelbaum, Joel	M	January 1, 1887	August 19, 1979 (aged 92)	Romania
Weissmandl, Chaim	M	October 25, 1903	November 29, 1957 (aged 54)	Hungary
Wiechert, Ernst	M	May 18, 1877	August 24, 1950 (aged 73)	Poland

== Other ==
=== Living ===
Name	Sex	Birth (age)	Country
Bingham, Walter	M	January 5, 1924 (age 102)	Germany
Clarke, Eva	F	April 29, 1945 (age 81)	Czechoslovakia
Ledermann, Barbara	F	September 4, 1925 (age 101)	Germany

=== Deceased ===
Name	Sex	Birth	Death (age)	Country
Arndt, Arthur	M	August 20, 1893	January 13, 1974 (aged 80)	Germany
Bialowitz, Philip	M	December 25, 1925	August 6, 2016 (aged 90)	Poland
Bornstein, Ernst Israel	M	November 26, 1922	August 14, 1978 (aged 55)	Poland
Bornstein, Renee	F	February 10, 1934	November 28, 2024 (aged 90)	France
Cohen, Henriette	F	August 17, 1917	June 25, 2019 (aged 101)	France
Dobrowolski, Antoni	M	October 8, 1904	October 21, 2012 (aged 108)	Poland
Eisen, Hilda	F	April 25, 1917	December 22, 2017 (aged 100)	Poland
Felenbaum-Weiss, Hela	F	January 2, 1924	December 1, 1988 (aged 64)	Poland
Freiberg, Dov	M	May 15, 1928	May 1, 2008 (aged 79)	Poland
Greenfield, Martin	M	August 9, 1928	March 20, 2024 (aged 95)	Czechoslovakia
Goldstein, Kurt Julius	M	November 3, 1914	September 24, 2007 (aged 92)	Germany
Kleinfeld Schachter, Hedda	F	February 5, 1924	March 29, 2023 (aged 99)	Austria
Kovačič, Anica	F	March 28, 1923	March 11, 2019 (aged 95)	Slovenia
Kristal, Yisrael	M	September 15, 1903	August 11, 2017 (aged 113)	Poland/Israel
Lapid, Tommy	M	December 27, 1931	June 1, 2008 (aged 76)	Yugoslavia/Israel
Leiber, Judith	F	January 11, 1921	April 28, 2018 (aged 97)	Hungary
Meijers, Clara	F	August 27, 1885	October 13, 1964 (aged 79)	Netherlands
Piasek, Abe	M	November 10, 1928	January 15, 2020 (aged 91)	Poland/United States
Reichmann, Eva Gabriele	F	January 16, 1897	September 19, 1998 (aged 101)	Germany/UK
Robert, Rudolf	M	February 11, 1922	1997 (aged 74–75)	Germany
Rosensaft, Hadassah	F	August 26, 1912	October 3, 1997 (aged 85)	Poland
Serchuk, Joseph	M	1919	November 6, 1993 (aged 73–74)	Poland
Stanisław Szmajzner	M	March 13, 1927	March 3, 1989 (aged 61)	Poland
Tramiel, Jack	M	December 13, 1928	April 8, 2012 (aged 83)	Poland
Vidovsky, Yehuda	M	July 25, 1919	September 13, 2026 (aged 107)	Poland
Wdowiński, Dawid	M	May 26, 1896	1970 (aged 73–74)	Poland
Westheimer, Ruth	F	June 4, 1928	July 12, 2024 (aged 96)	Germany
Zieman, Isaac	M	May 6, 1920	April 2, 2007 (aged 86)	Latvia/Germany

== See also ==
- 3GNY
- American Gathering of Jewish Holocaust Survivors and their Descendants
- Heroic Children, a collection of true stories about child survivors
- List of survivors of Sobibor
- List of victims and survivors of Auschwitz
- Holocaust denial
- Jews escaping from Nazi Europe
- List of victims of Nazism
- Selvino children
- Sh'erit ha-Pletah

=== Documentaries about Holocaust survivors ===
- The Boys of Buchenwald
- The Lady in Number 6
- Marion's Triumph
- One Survivor Remembers, directed by Kary Antholis
- Pola's March
- Shoah, directed by Claude Lanzmann
