= Anne Levy =

Anne Levy or Lévy may refer to:

- Anne Levy (politician), Australian politician
- Anne Skorecki Levy (born 1935), American educator and activist
- Anne Lévy (public health manager), Swiss manager
- Anne Lévy-Morelle (born 1961), Belgian film director and writer
- Anne Wexler (1930–2009), née Levy, American political consultant

== See also ==
- Anne Lévy-Morelle, Belgian film director and writer
