= Theme-centered interaction =

Theme-centered interaction (TCI) is a concept and a method for working in groups. Its aim is social learning and development of the person. Since the nineteen fifties, TCI has been developed in the United States by the psychoanalyst and psychologist Ruth Cohn, by the therapists Norman Liberman, Isaac Zieman and by other representatives of humanistic psychology. Later, TCI was developed further in Europe and in India. TCI arose from the theoretical background of psychoanalysis, of group therapy and of humanistic psychology; it takes experiences from Gestalt therapy and from group dynamics into account. Ruth Cohn's original purpose was to "enable a healthy person to remain healthy". Here "health" not only refers to individual well-being, but also to political responsibility in the world.

In the first years after the development of TCI, its use grew rapidly in the United States. Today, however, TCI is virtually unknown in the United States, but it continues to be well-known and an important concept for educators, therapists, supervisors and managers in Germany, Switzerland, Austria, Hungary, and India. In India, a major practitioner of TCI is Dr. C. Thomas Abraham.

== The concept of TCI ==
=== The basis of TCI ===
The concept of TCI develops on the basis of three axioms which describe certain problems in dialectical form.

Autonomy:

The human being is a psycho-biological entity. He/she is also part of the universe, and therefore at once autonomous and interdependent. The person's autonomy increases to the extent that she/he becomes conscious of being interdependent (being part of the universe).

Appreciation:

Respect is due to all living entities and to their growth. Respecting growth requires decisions based on values. The humane is valuable, the inhumane is threatening.

Expanding one's limits:

A free decision happens within conditioning internal and external limits. It is possible to expand these limits.

=== Postulates of TCI ===
The axioms lead to the following methodical postulates:

- Be your own chair person, the chair person of yourself.
  This means the challenge to see yourself, other persons and the environment in their possibilities and limits, and to accept every situation as a proposition for your own decision.
- Disturbances and passionate involvements take precedence.
  "The postulate that disruptions and violent feelings have priority means that we respect the reality of man; and this reality contains the fact that our lively, emotional bodies and souls carry our thoughts and deeds."
- Be responsible for what you do and do not do - in your personal life and in society.

The postulates should not be seen as rules, but rather as descriptions of fact. Hence: disturbances do take their precedence - whether we let them or not. (If there is a tree lying across the street, the cyclist will have to give it the right of way if he wants to avoid a collision). And similarly for the postulate concerning the chair person: de facto, the human being is responsible for the partial power which he/she has been given. De facto, he/she is responsible for deeds and omissions.
But since these postulates are now formulated as imperatives, they want to teach us to act in this way.

The first two postulates have been widely adopted by group methods. The first calls upon the individual to be aware of their own feelings and to decide responsibly for themselves and others. The second highlights that hidden disturbances may interfere with group processes, and will have to be noticed or cured to make productive group work possible.

=== The four factor model, and dynamical balance ===
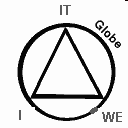

The next level of methods, the most important, says that in group processes, interests of the individual (I), the developing relational pattern of the group (WE) and the problem at hand, the theme (IT) must be in dynamical balance.

This can be symbolized by a triangle placed in a circle. The triangle in the circle symbolizes the GLOBE, that is the organisational, physical, structural, social, political, ecological surroundings, in a narrow and wider sense, which condition and influence the teamwork of the group, and which in turn are influenced by the work of the group. The globe can create disturbances and it can upset dynamical balance, shifting weight to one corner of the triangle.

In earlier times, "IT" was considered to be the "theme". In present TCI literature there is a differentiation: the theme on which the group is working is influenced by all four factors, not only by "IT". This point is specific to TCI.

=== Auxiliary rules of TCI ===
The auxiliary rules may have a positive influence on the interactions within a group. "It is important that auxiliary rules are used in a diplomatic and not in a dictatorial manner. Every rule can be reduced to absurdity."

1. Represent yourself in your statements, saying "I", not "we" or "one". The latter forms would mean that you "hide" behind the group or behind some public opinion. In addition, such a way of communicating would make it easy to represent a hypothesis as a fact which it is not.
2. If you ask a question, say why you ask and what this question means to you. Reveal yourself as a person and avoid an interview
  "A true question requires informations that are necessary for understanding and for continuing a process. An authentic request for information becomes clearer and more personal if you state the reasons for this request.“
3. Be authentic and selective in your communications. Be aware of what you think and feel, and choose what you want to say and do.
4. Restrain yourself as long as possible in interpreting others. Speak of your personal reactions instead.
5. Hold off from generalisations.
  Generalisations disrupt the group process. They only serve the discussion if they are used to finalize one subject and introduce a new subject.
6. If you make a statement concerning behavior or characteristics of another participant, then say also what it means to you that they are the way they are. (i.e., how you see them).
7. Side discussions take precedence. They are annoying and usually important. They would not happen if they were not important.
  Even if side discussions are ostensibly disturbing, they are usually important for the deeper levels of communication. They may bring new stimuli, emphasize ambiguities and misunderstandings or expose a disturbed interaction (relation).
8. Only one person speaks at a time.
  Nobody can listen to more than one statement at a time. And listening shows the concentrated mutual interest that holds a group together.
9. If more persons want to speak at the same time, tell each other in keywords what you intend to talk about.
  So all the subjects are highlighted shortly before group action continues.
10. Watch body language!
  Watch your own body language and that of others.

== Practical use ==
Theme-centered interaction is being used in diverse applications: in management, in the university, in psychological guidance and therapy, in supervision, in education, in social and special pedagogy, in adult education, in pastoral care, in care of patients, etc. It is the explicit goal of TCI not only to support the leader, but also to enable a group to lead itself (chair person postulate).

In his Ph.D. thesis, Friedrich Ewert has investigated the influence of TCI training upon the professional ability of teachers active in various types of schools and in teacher training. He found a lasting effect of TCI training upon the teaching skills, and a strengthening of their personalities.

== Learning TCI ==
TCI is being taught by members of the Ruth Cohn Institute (RCI) for TCI international. This is an association located in Basel, Switzerland, with sections in all German speaking countries, in the Netherlands, Hungary, Poland, and India.

The training consists of two sections: basic training and diploma training. The basic training consists of formation of the personality and of methods, it lasts 6 1/2 weeks and is terminated by a certificate. The diploma training lasts about ten weeks and contains elements like supervision, working in peer groups, more workshops for formation of the personality, and methods. Normally, basic and diploma training take several years. Teaching TCI requires a third level of training which is completed by graduation.

Since 1987, RCI international has been publishing a biannual journal "Theme-centered interaction" through Psychosozial-Verlag, Giessen, Germany. The articles are in German, but for some, there is also an English abstract.

Every two years, an International Congress and Exchange Workshop is held on behalf of RCI international. In April, 2012, this was held in Lindau, Germany, celebrating Ruth Cohn's 100th birthday.

== Literature (in English) ==
- Mina Schneider-Landolf, Jochen Spielmann, Walter Zitterbarth (Hrsg.): Handbook of Theme-Centered Interaction (TCI)) Vandenhoeck & Ruprecht, Göttingen 2017, ISBN 978-3-525-45190-8. Free download: https://www.vr-elibrary.de/isbn/9783525451908
- Mary Anne Kuebel (ed.): Living Learning. A Reader In Theme-Centered Interaction, Media House Delhi, ISBN 81-7495-104-0
- Philipp Bachmann: The Timeless Way of Educating. Theme-Centered Interaction, a Pattern Language by Ruth C. Cohn in: Proceedings of the 22nd Conference on Pattern Languages of Programs. The Hillside Group, Pittsburgh, PA 2015, pp. 22:1-22:28, ISBN 978-1-941652-03-9

== Literature (in German) ==
- Mina Schneider-Landolf, Jochen Spielmann, Walter Zitterbarth (Hrsg.): Handbuch Themenzentrierte Interaktion (TZI). Mit einem Vorwort von Friedemann Schulz von Thun. Vandenhoeck & Ruprecht, Göttingen 2009, ISBN 978-3-525-40152-1.
- Cornelia Löhmer, Rüdiger Standhardt (Hrsg.): TZI Pädagogisch-therapeutische Gruppenarbeit nach Ruth C. Cohn. Klett-Cotta, Stuttgart 1993, ISBN 3-608-95992-0.
- Barbara Langmaack: Themenzentrierte Interaktion. Einführende Texte rund ums Dreieck. 4. Auflage, Beltz Psychologie-Verlags-Union, Weinheim 2000, ISBN 3-621-27233-X.
- Cornelia Löhmer, Rüdiger Standhardt: TZI – Die Kunst, sich selbst und eine Gruppe zu leiten. Einführung in die Themenzentrierte Interaktion. Klett-Cotta, Stuttgart 2006, ISBN 3-608-94426-5.
- Ruth C. Cohn: Von der Psychoanalyse zur themenzentrierten Interaktion. Von der Behandlung einzelner zu einer Pädagogik für alle. Klett-Cotta, Stuttgart 1975, ISBN 3-608-95288-8.
- Ruth C. Cohn: Verantworte Dein Tun und dein Lassen – persönlich und gesellschaftlich. Offener Brief an Günter Hoppe. In: Themenzentrierte Interaktion. Theme-centered Interaction. 8. Jahrgang, Heft 2, Herbst 1994.
- Günther Hoppe: «Misch Dich ein! Greif ein!» Ein drittes Postulat für die TZI? In: Cornelia Löhmer, Rüdiger Standhardt (Hrsg.): Zur Tat befreien. Gesellschaftspolitische Perspektiven der TZI-Gruppenarbeit. Matthias Grünewald Verlag, Mainz 1994.
- Helmut Quitmann: Humanistische Psychologie. 3. überarb. u. erw. Auflage, Göttingen, Bern u. a. 1996, ISBN 3-8017-0908-6.
- Friedrich Ewert: Themenzentrierte Interaktion (TZI) und pädagogische Professionalität von Lehrerinnen und Lehrern, Erfahrungen und Reflexionen. VS Research, Wiesbaden 2008, ISBN 978-3-8350-7010-3.
