= Zieman =

Zieman is a surname. Notable people with the surname include:

- Isaac Zieman (1920–2007), Latvian Holocaust survivor
- Lyle Zieman (1921–2003), American politician
- Mark Zieman (born 1945), American politician
- Nancy Zieman (1953–2017), American author and designer

== See also ==
- Ziemann
