= Veliko Polje =

Veliko Polje, a Slavic toponym meaning "large field", may refer to:

- Veliko Polje, Slovenia, a village near Sežana, Slovenia
- Veliko Polje, Zagreb, a village south of Zagreb, Croatia
- Veliko Polje, Virovitica-Podravina County, a village near Lukač, Croatia
- Veliko Polje, Obrenovac, a village in Serbia
- Veliko Polje, an area of the Igman mountain plateau, Bosnia and Herzegovina
