= Richard Rudolph (disambiguation) =

Richard Rudolph (born 1946) is an American songwriter, musician, music publisher and producer.

Richard Rudolph may also refer to:

- Richard Rudolph (concentration camp survivor) (1911–2014), last surviving victim of "double persecution"
- Richard C. Rudolph (1909–2003), American professor of Chinese literature and archaeology
- Dick Rudolph, (1887–1949), American baseball player
