= Eric Vogel =

Eric T. Vogel (1896–1980) was a Czech jazz trumpeter. In 1938, Vogel played trumpet in a dixieland combo. After being arrested at Brno in 1939 he was made to organize a jazz school in the Jewish ghetto of that city. In Theresienstadt concentration camp he played with Martin Roman's Ghetto Swingers and Fritz Weiss's Jazz-Quintet-Weiss. He escaped while being transferred to Dachau concentration camp.
