= Ziemann =

Ziemann is a German surname. Notable people with the surname include:

- Benjamin Ziemann (born 1964), German historian
- Chris Ziemann (born 1976), American football player
- George Patrick Ziemann (1941–2009), American bishop
- Sonja Ziemann (1926–2020), German actress

== See also ==
- Zieman
