= Rudolf Robert =

- Born: Rudolf Ruben Robert; February 11, 1922; Berlin, Germany
- Died: 1997 (aged 74–75); Berlin, Germany
- Known for: Holocaust survivor

Rudolf Robert (11 February 1922 – 1997) was a German-Jewish survivor of the holocaust and a Gabbai of the Jewish community of Berlin.

== Early life and Holocaust ==
Robert was born into a Jewish family originating from Eastern Europe. Under the Nazi regime the family started to suffer from the ongoing anti-Semitic legislation und eventually lost their entire property. Because of being Jewish, the family was deported to the Nazi concentration camp of Auschwitz in South-Eastern Poland. During the death march from Auschwitz, Robert lost his brother who died during the struggle. Robert himself survived the concentration camp together with his friend Alfred Jachmann.

== Later life and role in the Jewish community of Berlin ==
After WW2, Robert became an important witness during the Nuremberg trials, inter alia against the German chemical and pharmaceutical industry conglomerate IG Farben.

Instead of moving to the London or New York City like other parts of the family or emigrating to Palestine, Robert returned to West-Berlin during the post-war period where he lived with his wife and his two children. His son Matthias later also became a Gabbai at the Jewish Community of Berlin.

Together with Estrongo Nachama he became one of the most important faces of the Jewish community of Berlin which he helped to develop and eventually became Gabbai of the liberal Synagogue Pestalozzistraße.

Rudolf Robert died in Berlin in 1997.

== Miscellaneous ==
Rudolf Robert's nephew is the Berlin-based entrepreneur and investor Felix Schaal.

== In literature ==
Rudolf Robert has been quoted in Hermann Langbein's book People of Auschwitz. In the book, Robert tells Langbein about his terrible experience in the concentration camp and how he has been paralyzed by having seen other inmates "running around with gaping wounds".
