= Ghetto Swingers =

Jewish swing band in the Theresienstadt concentration camp

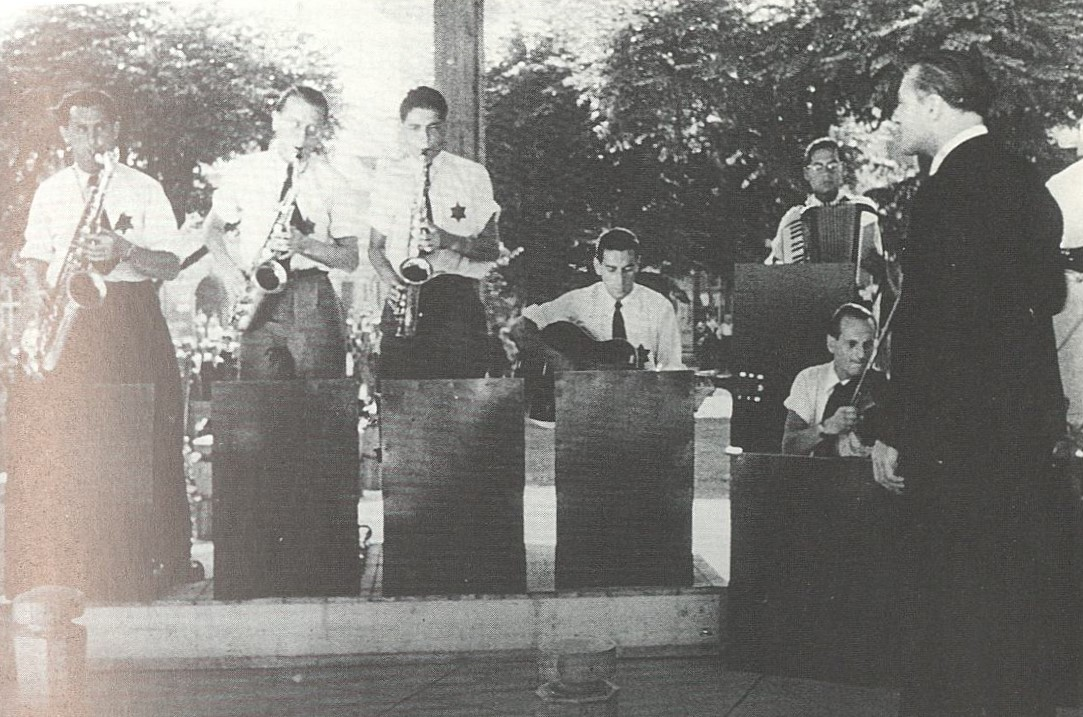
The Ghetto Swingers playing in the 1944 propaganda film.

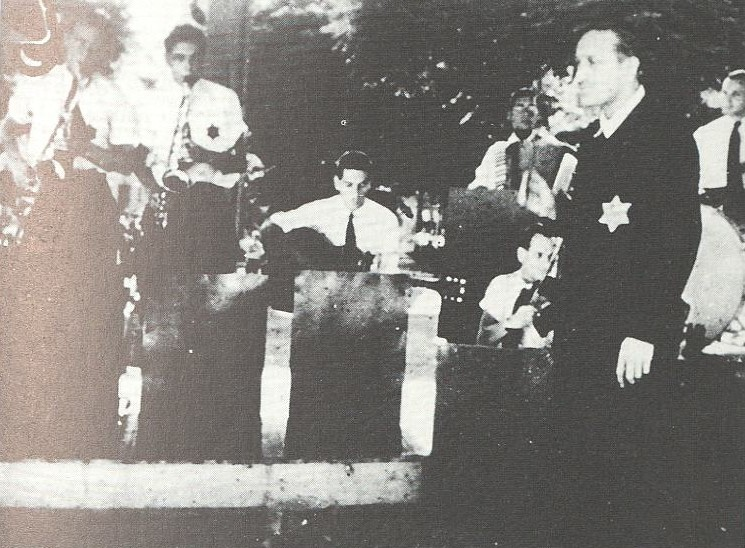
Another frame of the film

The Ghetto Swingers were a jazz band organised in the Nazi concentration camp Theresienstadt.

The original amateur Czech band playing in the Café of the Ghetto was led by Eric Vogel and Pavel Libensky. Vogel petitioned the Kommandant on January 8, 1943. The personnel of The Ghetto Swingers would be: Dr. Brammer (piano), Dr. Kurt Bauer (percussion), Fr. Goldschmidt (guitar), Fasal (bass), Ing. Vogel (trumpet), Langer (tenor sax and clarinet), and Fr. Mautner (trombone).

When the famous jazz pianist Martin Roman arrived in the camp he was asked to lead. The band appeared in a Theresienstadt cabaret review, known as the Karussell ("Carousel"). The Ghetto Swingers performed over fifty times, most frequently during June and July 1944. The cabarets were organised by Kurt Gerron, who could draw upon the best talent in the camp. Both Roman and Gerron had come to Theresienstadt via the Westerbork transit camp, and qualified for entry to Theresienstadt as "artists".

After the Red Cross visit to the camp, Commandant Karl Rahm instructed Gerron to make a propaganda film. Footage shows the Ghetto Swingers playing on the wooden pavilion built for Karel Ančerl's string orchestra in the town's main square. After the camp closed, the members of the jazz band were sent to Auschwitz. Martin Roman and guitarist Coco Schumann survived. Kurt Gerron and clarinetist Bedřich "Fritz" Weiss did not.

Schumann's 1997 biography includes a photo of the Ghetto Swingers, with Roman, Schumann, Weiss (clarinet and saxophone), Fritz Goldschmidt (guitar), Nettl (accordion), Jetti Kantor and Ratner (violin), Josef Taussig (trombone) and others; Kohn, Chokkes, and Erich Vogel (trumpet), Donde (tenor saxophone), Pavel Libensky (double bass), and Fredy Haber (tenor). Some of the players overlapped with the Jazz-Quintet-Weiss.

== See also ==
- Swingjugend
- Women's Orchestra of Auschwitz
- Charlie and his Orchestra – German propaganda swing band
