= Ruth Cohn =

German psychotherapist, educator, and poet

Ruth Charlotte Cohn
- Born: Ruth Charlotte Hirschfeld; 27 August 1912; Berlin, German Empire
- Died: 30 January 2010 (aged 97); Düsseldorf, Germany
- Occupations: psychotherapist, psychologist, teacher
- Known for: Creation of Theme-centered interaction
- Spouse: Hans-Helmut Cohn
- Children: Heidi Ursula, Peter Ronald I grandchildren = Elizabeth Emily Weiner, Eric Bert Weiner
- Parent(s): Arthur Hirschfeld and Elisabeth Heidenheimer
- Awards: 1971 Psychologist of the Year; 1979 Dr. phil h.c., University of Hamburg; 1992 Grand Merit Cross of the Federal Republic of Germany, 1994 Dr. phil h.c., University of Bern

Ruth Charlotte Cohn (born 27 August 1912 in Berlin, died 30 January 2010 in Düsseldorf) was a psychotherapist, educator, and poet. She is best known as the creator of a method for learning in groups called theme-centered interaction (TCI). She was the founder of the Workshop Institute for Living Learning (WILL), which is known today as the Ruth Cohn Institute for TCI.

== Early life ==
Ruth Cohn was born as the second child of an assimilated Jewish family in Berlin. Her father, Arthur Hirschfeld, was a banker, her mother Elisabeth, a pianist, came from a merchant family. In 1931/32 she studied economics and psychology at the Universities of Heidelberg and Berlin. When Hitler came to power in 1933, after disturbing and frightening experiences with National Socialism she fled to Zurich, Switzerland, where she studied psychology and minored in pre-clinical medicine and psychiatrics at the university. In addition, she studied education, theology, literature and philosophy. From 1934 to 1939, she was also trained as a psychoanalyst at the International Society for Psychoanalysis. In 1936, she — like all German Jews living in foreign countries — lost her German citizenship. In 1938, she married Hans-Helmut Cohn, a medical student of German-Jewish heritage.

In 1940, her daughter Heidi Ursula was born. The following year, the family emigrated to the United States. There, she was trained in Early Childhood Progressive Education at the Bank Street School (now Bank Street College of Education) in New York City. From 1941 to 1944, she was trained as a psychotherapist at the William Alanson White Institute of Psychiatry, Psychoanalysis & Psychology in New York. At Columbia University, she earned her master's degree (M.A.) in psychology, and she became certified as a psychologist. Her son Peter Ronald was born in 1944. Her grandson Eric Bert Weiner was born in 1971. Her granddaughter Elizabeth Emily Weiner was born in 1975.

In 1946, after being divorced, she moved with both children to New Jersey and she started a private psychoanalytical practice in New York City. Not least by her training in group therapy, she was gradually led away from classical psychoanalysis in the direction of experiential psychotherapy. In 1955, she initiated a workshop with the theme "Countertransference" whose methodical approach formed the basis for the development of experiential therapy and theme-centered interaction (TCI).

== Theme-Centered Interaction ==
There were two aspects that led to the creation of TCI: Firstly, "the couch was too small"! The couch of psychoanalysis was only for one person at a time. Should it not be possible to serve the progress of humanism in marriage, in school, in politics, in the working life by means of psychology, psychotherapy and pedagogics? The couch was too small: the group was needed.

Secondly, Ruth Cohn was dissatisfied with her finding that therapeutical groups were so full of human encounters and experiences, whereas the life in class rooms was so academic, so abstract. It should be possible to form and lead learning and work groups in such a way that there would be some activation by lively dialogue, some self-determination, some personal engagement. The answer was TCI.

At the beginning of 1960s Ruth Cohn worked in commercial enterprises using TCI for the first time. From 1965 to 1966, she was trained in gestalt therapy by Fritz Perls. She founded the Workshop Institute for Living Learning (WILL) 1966 in New York and in 1972 in Switzerland, an institute for training and research in theme-centered interaction.

== Later years ==
After having been invited to European congresses many times, she finally closed her private practice in the US, and in 1974, she returned to Europe and went to live in Hasliberg-Goldern (Switzerland) where she consulted for the Ecole d'Humanité until 1998. She also opened a private practice and worked as a TCI teacher. From 1994 on, she lived on the Hasliberg only in the summer months, but otherwise with her friend and WILL graduate, Helga Hermann, in Düsseldorf (Germany). She died in Düsseldorf.

== Achievements ==
Ruth leaves behind a well-established organization, the Ruth Cohn Institute for TCI International, with headquarters in Basel, Switzerland. Her life and work have influenced the lives and work of many others on several continents, but most of her publications are in German. She is survived by her son Peter who lives in Denver, Colorado, and by her grandson Eric in Providence, and granddaughter Elizabeth in New York.

Ruth was the author of many poetic sayings, for example "Don't analyze in a burning house."

== Ruth Cohn as teacher ==
- 1957–73 Teaching at the Center for Psychotherapy (later Center for Mental Health), in the Group Therapy section
- 1973 Guest professor for TCI at Clark University, Massachusetts

== Awards ==
- 1971 Psychologist of the Year, awarded by the New York Society for Clinical Psychology
- 1979 Honorary doctorate (Dr. phil. h.c.), awarded by the Faculty of Psychology, University of Hamburg, Germany
- 1992 Grand Merit Cross of the Federal Republic of Germany
- 1994 Honorary doctorate (Dr. phil. h.c.), awarded by the Institute for Psychology of the Faculty for Philosophy and History of the University of Bern, Switzerland

== Legacy ==
In the first years after the development of Theme-centered interaction, its use grew rapidly in the United States. Today, however, TCI is virtually unknown in the United States, but it continues to be well-known and an important concept for educators, therapists, supervisors and managers in Germany, Switzerland, Austria, Hungary, and India.

== See also ==
- Theme-centered interaction
- Gestalt therapy
