= Ben Fainer =

Holocaust survivor and educator

Bernard "Ben" Joseph Fainer (1 May 1930 – 2016) was a Holocaust survivor and educator who documented his experiences in his 2012 memoir, Silent for Sixty Years.

== Biography ==
=== The Holocaust ===
Fainer was born in Bedzin, Poland to Rubin Fainer and Hannah Ida Urman Fainer. He was abducted from his home by the Nazis at the age of nine and forced into six slave labor camps including Blechhammer, a satellite location of Auschwitz-Birkenau, where he worked in a metal shop. He was later moved to Buchenwald concentration camp.

Fainer was liberated during a death march near Buchenwald at the age of 15. His mother, three siblings, and 250 relatives were murdered in the Holocaust. His father survived.

=== Post war ===
Following liberation, Fainer stayed with relatives in Ireland where her met his wife, Susie. The couple passed through Canada before settling in St. Louis, MIssouri in 1957. They had seven children.

Fainer worked at Barad & Company.

=== Memoir ===
Fainer didn't speak about his experiences during The Holocaust for sixty years after which he recorded testimony for the Shoah Foundation and spoke regularly spoke to students at the St. Louis Kaplan Feldman Holocaust Museum. Fainer, with his friend Mark W. Leach, wrote a memoir about his experiences. The book, titled Silent for Sixty Years, was published in 2012.

=== Artifact ===
While at Blechhammer, Fainer made a bracelet with his name, his mother's maiden name, and his ID number. The bracelet was discovered during a 1990s archaeological dig near Buchenwald. In 2018, the bracelet was returned to Fainer's daughter who donated it to the St. Louis Kaplan Feldman Holocaust Museum.
