= Anica Kovačič =

Befriended Anne Frank in Bergen-Belsen

- Born: March 28, 1923; Veliko Polje, Italianized Slovene Littoral
- Died: March 11, 2019 (aged 95)

Anica Kovačič (née Mislej; March 28, 1923 – March 11, 2019) was a Slovenian woman who befriended Anne Frank in Bergen-Belsen.

== Biography ==
Anica Kovačič (née Mislej) was born on March 28, 1923, in Veliko Polje near Sežana. Her father made a living cutting wood, unable to advance as a Slovenian at a time of Italian fascism. She joined the resistance movement during World War II but was betrayed and arrested by the German army in the village of Prestranek in 1944, imprisoned in Gorica, and sent to the Bergen-Belsen concentration camp on January 26, 1945. It was there she became friends with Anne Frank, and they spent much of their time together and were able to communicate as they both knew various Slavic languages. Kovačič reported that Frank had grown weak and was losing hope. She tried to comfort her and lift her spirits, but Frank died March 31, 1945. Kovačič was liberated by the British April 23, 1945.

After the camp was liberated, Kovačič received treatment in Osterwald and returned home to Prestranek on August 17, 1945, resuming her old life and marrying. Although she learned that Anne's diary had been published, she did not speak about her friendship to anyone at the time.

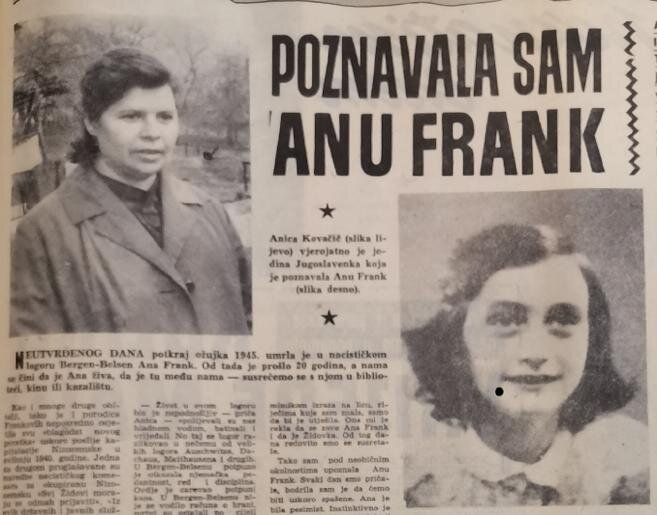
1965 article in Croatian newspaper Vjesnik about Anica Kovačič's friendship with Anne Frank

In 1965, the Croatian newspaper Vjesnik published an article about Kovačič with photographs of her and Frank. It discussed how Kovačič was likely the only Yugoslav woman who knew Frank and was with her when she died. However, the article didn't generate interest by the public at the time.

In 2013, historians Igor Jovanović and Igor Šaponja rediscovered Kovačič after hearing about her from women who had also been imprisoned in Bergen-Belsen including Rina Smajla. They interviewed her in 2013 and published the interview in 2018. When speaking of the diary, Kovačič said she was pleased that (Frank) had written a "true story ... and of course, we just felt we were all like her.” When asked by Šaponja if anyone was interested in the fact that Anica knew Anna, she replied “Nobody asked.”

She spent her later years in a nursing home in Tolmin.

== Interactions with Anne Frank ==
The two talked with each other daily. Frank died on 31 March 1945, prior to the liberation of the camp.

In an interview in 2013 with the historians Igor Jovanović and Igor Šaponja from Pula, Kovačič said she knew Anne Frank from January 26 to March 31, 1945. She recalled her crying because her mother and sister had died and she was alone. Kovačič recalled trying to cheer Anna up and comfort her:

[Frank] said that she wouldn’t last. I said, “Be patient, hold on,” I held her, I said, “Don’t die. No, no, hold on. Just keep it that way!”, right? She said, “I won’t make it,” she said. “I won’t.” But then she died. She died with me holding her in my arms.
