= Ella Blumenthal =

Holocaust survivor (born 1921)

- Born: 25 July 1921 (age 105)
- Known for: Survivor of the Holocaust; Subject of the Documentary I am Here
- Children: 4

Ella Blumenthal (born 15 August 1921) is a Polish-Jewish Holocaust survivor. In 1940, she was moved to the Warsaw Ghetto, where she participated in the Warsaw Ghetto Uprising. She and her niece Roma Rothstein were the only members of their immediate family to survive the Holocaust. She is the subject of the 2021 documentary I am Here.

== Early life ==
Ella Blumenthal was born on 25 July 1921, in Warsaw, Poland. She was the youngest of seven children. Her father was a textile merchant. She had a happy childhood and was a happy teenager until the Nazi Invasion of Poland in 1939. In October 1940, she was forcibly put into the Warsaw Ghetto along with her family. In the Warsaw Ghetto, Blumenthal helped an underground Jewish organization publish and distribute leaflets. As one of the leaflets said,

Citizens, Jews awaken from your lethargy, stand up to fight. Do not believe that they are sending us to labour camps. It is a vicious lie. Our brothers and sisters are being brutally murdered in the death camp Treblinka. Brothers, prepare to defend yourselves. Those who are not fit for fighting should go underground and hide in cellars and bunkers. Turn every building into a fortress. We have no right to occupy the surface of the earth, because we are condemned to death.

During her time in the Ghetto, Blumenthal's family members kept being taken and put onto transports to concentration and death camps. By the time of the Warsaw Ghetto Uprising, Blumenthal had only two family members left, her father and her eldest niece, Roma Rothstein. From 19 April to 16 May 1943, Blumenthal helped to participate in the Warsaw Ghetto uprising. After the uprising failed, she and the remaining Jews were transported to the Majdanek and Treblinka death camps.

== Life in concentration camps ==
From 1943 to 1945, Blumenthal stayed in three concentration camps: Majdanek, Auschwitz, and Bergen-Belsen. In Majdanek, her father, along with most of the other older prisoners, was sent to the gas chambers. Blumenthal and Rothstein were also sent to the gas chambers, but by chance there were 700 women in the gas chamber when the "quota" was 500. Because of this, 200 women were removed from the gas chamber. Blumenthal and Rothstein were two of the lucky ones to be removed. As Blumenthal said in a testimony:

An order was received to gas 500 Jewish women, not 700 as we were. We were told that the correct transport of 500 to be gassed would be arriving in the morning and we would be sent to another camp. At dawn when we were chased out, there was a contingent of women coming off the cattle trucks, and they were led straight to the gas chamber which we had just left. "Ordnung muss sein." There must be order. Due to German orderliness and the irony of fate, we evaded the Angel of Death.

Soon after, Blumenthal and Rothenstein were moved to Auschwitz. While there, Rothstein contracted typhus and was moved to a hospital. On the third day of her being there, the doctor warned her that all remaining patients would be gassed. Unable to walk, Rothstein crawled out of the hospital and survived. Blumenthal also contracted typhus, but was too afraid to go to the hospital. Instead, she hid in the block houses and toilet. At one point, Rothstein asked Blumenthal if she would commit suicide with her by touching the electrically charged barbed wire fence. Blumenthal refused, as she still wished to live.

In November 1944, Blumenthal and Rothstein were moved to the Bergen-Belsen concentration camp. They remained there until the British Army liberated the camp on 15 April 1945.

== After the war ==
After the war, Blumenthal went to Warsaw with the hope of finding her remaining family members who had not been in the Warsaw Ghetto. Blumenthal was able to make contact with Rothstein's father. He had survived by leaving the Warsaw Ghetto and moving to Tel Aviv. He managed to get Blumenthal sent to Paris, where she lived until 1947, when the Rothsteins got a visa for her to join them in Tel Aviv. In Tel Aviv, Blumenthal met her future husband, whom she married 13 days after meeting him. Out of twenty-three immediate family members, she and the Rothsteins were the only survivors of the Holocaust.

In 2021, she was the subject of the documentary, I am Here, which documented her life in the Warsaw Ghetto and the Concentration camps. Blumenthal currently lives in Cape Town and has four children, eleven grandchildren and nine great-grandchildren. She turned 100 on 25 July that year.

Awards won by I am Here:

- Audience Choice Award, Durban International Film Festival, 2021
- Jury Award for Best SA Documentary (Oscar Qualifying), Durban International Film Festival, 2021 Best Director, Jozi Film Festival, 2021
- Audience Choice Award for Best Documentary, Atlanta Jewish Film Festival, 2021
- Best Director, Africa Human Rights Film Festival, 2021
- Audience Choice Award, Africa Human Rights Film Festival, 2021
