= Leon Ginsburg =

Polish-American Holocaust survivor (1932–2014)

Ginsburg in 1993

Leon Ginsburg (born Noah Ginzburg; June 12, 1932 – March 10, 2014) was a Polish-American Holocaust survivor and the subject of several books on World War II. Known as a child by his Yiddish nickname "Noike" or "Noikele", he was the only child survivor from Maciejów – a shtetl of 5,000 in eastern Poland (now part of Ukraine) – after Poland was invaded in 1939 and the Nazis entered his town in the summer of 1941.

== Life ==
Noah Ginzburg was born in Maciejów to Orthodox Jewish parents Pesia (née Goldberg) and Kalman Ginzburg. He had an older sister, Blima "Blimele" (1928–1942), and an older brother, Tzvi Hershel (1930–1942). The family lived with his maternal grandmother and next to his paternal grandparents. After his father's death around 1934, Ginsburg's mother was the sole owner of a fabric store, while his grandparents produced footwear. During his childhood, he attended a Polish school in the mornings and a Jewish school in the afternoons, learning to speak Yiddish, Polish and Ukrainian.

In September 1939, upon their invasion of eastern Poland, the Soviets turned his school into a Russian school and seized the family store, with his mother managing to smuggle some of its merch out. Under the Nazi occupation of eastern Poland since 1941, Jewish men who were called to report were shot dead, Jewish homes were marked with yellow circles and adult Jews were required to wear star of David armbands. The family traded the fabrics that they had managed to save in exchange for food.

In early 1942, the SS broke into his ill grandfather's house, where the family was hiding, threatening Ginsburg to death so that he would reveal where his aunts and siblings were; he did not comply. The next September, with the help of non-Jewish locals, Nazi troops abducted his family and the head of the local Judenrat from his cousin's store where they were hidden. He was not found and managed to escape, finding refuge at his Hebrew teacher's house ahead of Yom Kippur. Ginsburg was again able to flee as his teacher's family was caught by the Nazis. He traveled to the Luboml ghetto, where he had an uncle, and reunited with his brother who had escaped the Maciejów roundups. In October, however, Luboml also began to be targeted by Nazis; as the brothers split up in search of food, Hershel was captured.

Ginsburg and his cousins left, but the latter were captured and executed by Ukrainian militias. He survived by hiding in a ditch and a drain pipe, and found shelter at the places of local farmers between 1942 and 1943. One of them, Jan Huber, registered Ginsburg in Maciejów as "Stanisław Kwiatkowski", presenting him as a Polish Catholic orphan; German authorities sent them to Chełm, and Ginsburg, with Huber's help, survived by doing little jobs at local farms until August 1944, when the Soviets liberated eastern Poland.

Ginsburg moved in with an aunt in the Chełm area, working at the Nosówka sugar factory before returning to Luboml and moving to Stettin in the summer of 1945. Between December 1945 and January 1946, he went to Germany and took the name Leon, soon finding himself at the Föhrenwald refugee camp. In December 1946, left without a family (all of his close relatives had been killed in 1942), he sailed from Bremen on the SS Marine Marlin with a group of orphans, emigrating to the United States and moving in with his great-aunt in Brooklyn, New York. He graduated from the Brooklyn Technical High School and the New York City College of Technology as an electrical engineer, and in 1962 he founded a company developing dental laboratory equipment.

In December 1958, Ginsburg married fellow Holocaust survivor Betty Hellner (b. 1938), with whom he settled in Tappan, New York, and had three children. He was a grandfather of seven.

Ginsburg was interviewed by Peter Jennings for his seminal book The Century (Doubleday, 1989) and by Jane Marks for her book Hidden Children of the Holocaust (Ballantine, 1993), as well as by Larry Papier for the United States Holocaust Memorial Museum in 1993. More recently, his story was written in its entirety by his daughter Suzanne under the title Noike: A Memoir of Leon Ginsburg (Avenger Books, 2012). Having moved to Lake Worth Beach, Florida in 2005, Ginsburg was also a speaker at Florida Atlantic University's Center for Holocaust and Human Rights Education.

== See also ==
- List of Holocaust survivors
