= Roma Rothstein =

Holocaust survivor (1926–2022)

- Born: Ruchama Rachel Rothstein; 2 June 1926; Warsaw, Republic of Poland
- Died: January 2022 (aged 95)
- Known for: Holocaust survivor, author of the autobiography "Here There Is No Why"

Ruchama Rachel Rothstein (2 June 1926 – January 2022) was a German-American Holocaust survivor and the author of Here There Is No Why. Her aunt Ella Blumenthal and she were the only members of their immediate family to survive the Holocaust.

== Early life ==
Rothstein was born in Warsaw, Republic of Poland on 2 June 1926, to Golda and Samuel Rothstein. Her mother owned a men's clothing shop, while her father was a Rabbi and journalist editor of the Yiddishe Tugblatt. Roma was the oldest of four children. She had a happy childhood until the Nazi invasion of Poland in 1939, when she was 13. After the invasion, Rothstein and her family were moved into the Warsaw Ghetto. Rothstein stayed there until the Warsaw Ghetto Uprising. Rothstein participated in the uprising by smuggling weapons around the ghetto. After the uprising failed, Rothstein, her aunt Ella Blumenthal, and Blumenthal's father were transferred to the Majdanek and Treblinka death camps, along with the rest of the surviving Warsaw Ghetto residents.

== Life in the concentration camps ==
From 1943 to 1945, Rothstein stayed in three concentration camps: Majdanek, Auschwitz, and Bergen-Belsen. In Majdanek, Blumenthal's father, along with most of the other older prisoners, was sent to the gas chambers. Blumenthal and Rothstein were also sent to the gas chambers, but by chance there were 700 women in the gas chamber when the "quota" was 500. Because of this, 200 women were removed from the gas chamber. Blumenthal and Rothstein were two of the lucky ones to be removed. As Blumenthal said in a testimony:

An order was received to gas 500 Jewish women, not 700 as we were. We were told that the correct transport of 500 to be gassed would be arriving in the morning and we would be sent to another camp. At dawn when we were chased out, there was a contingent of women coming off the cattle trucks, and they were led straight to the gas chamber which we had just left. "Ordnung muss sein." There must be order. Due to German orderliness and the irony of fate, we evaded the Angel of Death.

In July 1943, Blumenthal and Rothenstein were moved to Auschwitz. At Auschwitz, Rothstein and Blumenthal were shaved and tattooed with numbers. Rothstein's number was 48915. Rothstein contracted typhus in Auschwitz and was moved to a camp hospital. On the third day of her being there, the doctor warned her that all remaining patients would be gassed. Unable to walk, Rothstein crawled out of the hospital and survived. At one point, Rothstein asked Blumenthal if she would commit suicide with her by touching the electrically charged barbed wire fence. Blumenthal refused, as she still wished to live.

In November 1944, Blumenthal and Rothstein were moved to the Bergen-Belsen concentration camp. They remained here until the British Army liberated the camp on 15 April 1945.

== After the war ==
After the war, Blumenthal went to Warsaw with the hope of finding her remaining family members who had not been in the Warsaw Ghetto. Blumenthal was able to make contact with Rothstein's father. He had survived by leaving the Warsaw Ghetto and moving to Tel-Aviv. He managed to get Rothstein Blumenthal sent to Paris until 1947, when Samuel Rothstein was able to get visas for Rothstein and Blumenthal to join him in Tel-Aviv. While in Paris, Rothstein met Shlomo Roth, who she later married. Soon after her marriage, she and her husband emigrated to the United States, where they have five children.

In 2002 Rothstein published Here There Is No Why, under the name Rachel Roth, a memoir of her life and her time in the concentration camps.

Rothstein died in January 2022, at the age of 95.
