= 3GNY =

American non-profit organization

- Founded: 2005; 21 years ago
- Founder: Daniel Brooks
- Type: Educational and social organization for the grandchildren of Holocaust survivors
- Location: New York, New York
- Members: 1,500+
- Website: https://www.3gny.org

3GNY (Third Generation New York) is a non-profit organization composed of grandchildren of Holocaust survivors. The mission of the group is to "educate diverse communities about the perils of intolerance and to provide a supportive forum for the descendants of survivors."

3G refers to "Third Generation," a term used to denote grandchildren of Holocaust survivors.

== History ==
3GNY was founded in 2005 by Daniel Brooks. The organization began with six people and has since expanded to more than 1,500 members.

== Activities ==
3GNY offers programming several times per month that includes "Shabbat dinners, discussion groups, genealogy and writing workshops, museum tours and happy hours." The organization continues to hear directly from the survivors of the Holocaust as well as survivors from other genocides, such as Rwanda and Darfur.

In 2010, 3GNY launched an educational initiative entitled "WEDU" (We Educate), developed in conjunction with Facing History and Ourselves and the American Society for Yad Vashem. The four-week training empowers grandchildren of survivors to learn and compellingly share their family histories and lessons of the Holocaust with the next generation of diverse populations to educate on the perils of intolerance. 3GNY then facilitates speaking opportunities in classrooms, community settings, and corporate diversity, equity, and inclusion programming. Since the initiative's launch, 3GNY has trained more than 500 descendants of survivors, presented in hundreds of classrooms, reaching more than 50,000 students of all ages.

The New York Times profiled 3GNY in 2010 when Ike Davis, the first baseman for the New York Mets, met with the group. The mother of Davis is Jewish and many of her relatives were murdered in the Holocaust. Davis' great aunt though, survived the Holocaust. Regarding the event with 3GNY, Davis said, "I thought it was really cool meeting with them. These are people around my age who are trying to keep alive the memory of their family members and loved ones, maybe even people they never got to meet, so people never forget what happened."
