= Eva Salier =

German writer (1923–2014)

- Born: Eva Hellendag; March 26, 1923; Koblenz, Rhineland-Palatinate, Germany
- Died: August 12, 2014 (aged 91)
- Occupations: Artist, author

Eva Salier (née Hellendag; March 26, 1923 – August 12, 2014) was an artist, author and a survivor of the Nazi Holocaust.

== Early life, imprisonment ==
She was born on March 26, 1923, in Koblenz to Jewish parents Simon Hellendag (a Dutch merchant) and his wife Antonie.

She attended Horchheim elementary school from 1929 until 1933, when the Nazis rose to power. In 1933 she started at the Hilda School and where anti-Semitism was on the rise, she was spat on and insulted. Her father attempted to get her to England but died before that was possible, just as she was expelled from school. In 1938 her mother sent her to the Netherlands, where she was captured by Nazis. Officers separated her from the other 499 detainees and forgot about her location. She escaped, but was later arrested again with her family and made to do forced labour. In 1944 she was taken to Auschwitz-Birkenau but spared death after being declared fit to work and forced to assemble radios. In 1945 she was liberated.

== Liberation, adult life in the US ==
After World War II she emigrated to the United States, living most of the rest of her life in New Jersey. Eva recalls that in 1946 America people didn't believe the stories of her holocaust experience, or didn't want to hear them. Originally recorded for her son, Eva's records of these events were forgotten for decades before being rediscovered and published.

The story of her enslavement by the Nazis: "The Survival of a Spirit", is a summation of the hardships suffered by her small group of "girls" as they were forcibly moved between various secret locations where they worked on electronic gear, including sending tubes for the enigma coding machine and V-2 guidance systems. As she tells the story, she worked on the first solid state transistors that would replace the tubes in the guidance system of the V-2. But this has never seen the light of day. The book was also translated into German as Lebensweg einer Koblenzer Jüdin and as Ungebrochen durch die Hölle.

Her memoir is notable for its discussion of the use of humour as a coping tool to deal with traumatic events.

Her art work can be found in the book published in Sweden under the title “Pa Gransen Mellon Kroger och Fred” (On the boarder between War and Peace - memorial images from Malmo (Sweden) 1939–1945. Pages 140–141).

Salier taught art and painted. Her work is in the collection of the Goodwin Holocaust Museum and the Koblenz Mittelrhein Museum.

In 1995 Salier was interviewed, and the record of that interview is in the United States Holocaust Memorial Museum. Additionally, some of her letters from Vught concentration camp to her mother have been archived at the Holocaust Museum. A book of her collected works can be found at several public libraries and the Holocaust Museum in Washington, D.C.
