= St. Louis Kaplan Feldman Holocaust Museum =

- Former name: St. Louis Holocaust Museum & Learning Center
- Established: 1995
- Location: Creve Coeur, Missouri
- Coordinates: 38.684981°N 90.406211°W
- Type: Holocaust museum
- Website: stlholocaustmuseum.org

The St. Louis Kaplan Feldman Holocaust Museum, formerly the St. Louis Holocaust Museum & Learning Center, is a Holocaust museum located at 36 Millstone Campus Drive in Creve Coeur, Missouri. Its mission is to "use the history and lessons of the Holocaust to reject hatred, promote understanding, and inspire change".

== History ==
=== Founding ===
The St. Louis Holocaust Museum & Learning Center was founded in 1995, publicly opening on May 1, 1995. It operated as a department of Jewish Federation of St. Louis. The museum's opening was dedicated to Gloria M. Goldstein, the wife of museum benefactor Samuel Goldstein. Samuel Goldstein would die five years later at the age of 82.

=== Renovation and expansion ===
In August 2022, the museum split from the Jewish Federation of St. Louis to become an independent nonprofit entity. This followed a two-year $20 million renovation and expansion project. The new museum building opened to the public on November 2, 2022.
