= Angela Orosz =

Holocaust survivor (born 1944)

- Born: Angela Bein; December 21, 1944 (age 81); Auschwitz concentration camp, German-occupied Poland
- Other names: Angela Orosz-Richt, Angela Polgar
- Citizenship: Canada
- Occupations: Schoolteacher, Public speaker
- Years active: 2004-present
- Known for: Birth in Auschwitz, and later advocacy for Holocaust victims and survivors, and against Nazis
- Spouse: Julius Orosz (m. 1965)
- Children: 2
- Parents: Avraham (Tibor) Bein (father); Vera (Veronika) Otvos (mother); Sandor Polgar (stepfather)

Angela Orosz-Richt (born December 21, 1944) is a Holocaust survivor. Of several thousand babies born at the Auschwitz complex, she is one of the few who survived to liberation. Her testimony has led to the 21st century convictions of two former Nazis.

== Early life ==
=== Birth parents ===
Orosz-Richt's parents, Dr. Avraham (Tibor) Bein (born June 2, 1912) and Vera (Veronika) Otvos (born April 2, 1920), were Hungarian Jews. They married in March 1943, in Sarospatak, in northwest Hungary, where Avraham lived and Vera was working as a nanny. During the Nazi cleansing of Hungary in 1944, they were sent by cattle car on the day after Passover to the nearby Sátoraljaújhely ghetto. On May 22, they were sent on another cattle car to Auschwitz-Birkenau, where they arrived on May 25.

=== Concentration camp ===
Both went through the selection process upon entering Auschwitz, and were deemed fit for the work camps. Otvos-Bein was pregnant with Angela at the time, which should have been an immediate death sentence during selection. Her mother thought that her pregnancy would elicit sympathy, and told Josef Mengele about her pregnancy. He laughed, calling her a "stupid goose," and apparently did not believe her, sending her to the work camp instead of the gas chamber. She had prisoner number A6075 tattooed on her wrist.

Orosz-Richt's father, Tibor was murdered in the camp in July by another Jewish man a few months later at age 32, but her mother survived. She went through various work programs. Road construction proved too much for her in her pregnancy, and she told a prisoner in charge (the Blockaelteste) that she was pregnant, and was sent to work in the kitchen instead. There, late in her pregnancy, Mengele took her into the medical experimentation unit. He injected various poisons into her cervix. These left Otvos-Bein sterile, but did not kill the fetus. A Jewish camp doctor tried to convince the mother-to-be to abort the child, but Vera's mother appeared in a dream telling her that "Hashem (God) is with you", and she decided to keep the child.

When Otvos-Bein went into labor, she confided in another Blockaelteste, whose position and medical knowledge, gained from her own father's medical practice, allowed her to assist in the delivery. Due to the malnutrition and medical experimentation suffered by Otvos-Bein, the baby was severely underweight, about 2.5 lbs (a little over one kilogram), and too weak to audibly cry. This probably saved their lives. Vera Otvos-Bein returned to work two to three hours later, hiding her baby under rubbish, and nursing her for about a month until the camp was liberated by Allied forces. Otvos-Bein also breastfed another baby born at the camp on the day of liberation, György Faludi. According to Auschwitz museum records, they were the only two camp births known to survive.

=== Post-war ===
Shortly after liberation, Orosz-Richt's mother met Sandor Polgar, another survivor and widower with a surviving child, Ted Bolgar. The Polgar/Bolgar family was originally from Sarospatak, the hometown of Angela's biological father. Polgar helped Vera obtain a birth certificate for Angela, and the two were married. He died in 1957; Angela Orosz claims he died from the stress of antisemitism that was still openly exhibited in Hungary after the war.

They spent several months in the DP Camp at Sluzk. The four of them returned to Budapest in November 1945, where Otvos-Bein's mother had survived the war, hidden in a printing camp. Angela only attained a typical newborn weight of about 6.5 pounds (three kilograms) by her first year. Her mother was the only person who was convinced that she would live. Even her grandmother, who called her Varushka, thought she would die. Her legs were too weak to support her until age seven, and she remained fragile and very short her entire life.

When she started school, she complained to her mother that she wanted her recorded place of birth changed, because writing Auschwitz was too hard to spell (only later would she think about it as too hard an association). Her mother refused, telling her that it was her legacy, and she would grow to explain to people what that meant.

== Adult life ==
=== Parenthood and emigration ===
Orosz-Richt became a schoolteacher. She married Joseph Orosz in 1965, and had a daughter, Katy. Her young family fled communist Hungary in December 1973, on the pretext of visiting her mother Vera, who had moved to Montreal in 1966 to help her stepson, Ted Bolgar. Orosz arrived in Toronto on December 11, and continued raising her family and teaching in Canada. She bore a son in Montreal in 1982, the last of her two children. She moved to Montreal to be close to her daughter. As of 2020, she continues to live there. During the COVID-19 pandemic, she complained about the isolation, as she is a "social butterfly."

Some details of her history are known to her through a recording her daughter Katy made during a high school project of a telephone interview with Vera. Katy went on to earn a doctorate in Human Genetics from McGill University. She began her interest in cancer research due to Vera's death from cancer on January 28, 1992.

=== Activism ===
Orosz did not start talking publicly about the Holocaust until age 60, when she confided her story to Jeff Heinrich, a journalist with The Gazette daily newspaper in Montreal, part of Canada's national Canwest chain.

She first visited her birthplace in 2015, when she was 70. She noted her discomfort with traveling to Auschwitz in comfortable business class with an entourage knowing that her parents travelled to Auschwitz on a prisoner train.

The same year, she testified in Germany against Oskar Groening, a former Waffen SS guard known as "the bookkeeper of Auschwitz." In court, she stated that she could not remain silent, as she survived while other voices were stifled. Gröning received a four-year prison sentence.

I survived for a reason, because I have a mission to speak for those who cannot speak. I have a mission … to stand and point an accusing finger at those responsible for the inhumanity into which I was born.

— Testimony in 2015 trial

A year later, Orosz returned to Germany to testify against another former Auschwitz SS guard, Reinhold Hanning. He received a five-year sentence.

...on behalf of the six million Jews who cannot be here because they were murdered.

In fact, it was far more than six million that were murdered. Just think of all those children that didn’t grow up and have children, not to mention the many women who survived Auschwitz but were never able to have children.

And, as we know now, their children who in turn suffer from hormonal imbalances as a result of the chemicals their mothers were given. I’m not a mathematician but you don’t need to be to know that six million is actually a very misleading number.

— Testimony in 2016 trial

She returned to Auschwitz again for the 75th liberation anniversary.

In September 2022, in a guest contribution for the German-Jewish newspaper Jüdische Allgemeine, she criticized the United Nations for hosting Iranian President Ebrahim Raisi in New York: "I sometimes read that the United Nations were built on the ashes of the Holocaust. Today, that fact seems to have been forgotten. I was born into the ashes of the Holocaust. In December 1944, I could not cry but today I can. And I say this: Shame on you, United Nations, for hosting a man like Ebrahim Raisi! In doing so you insult millions of Jews around the world."
