= Sara Nomberg-Przytyk =

Polish-Jewish Holocaust memoirist

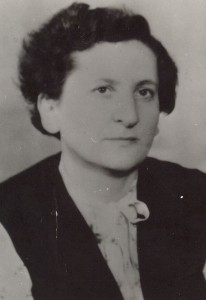
- Sara Nomberg-Przytyk
- Born: 1915; Lublin, Russian Poland
- Died: 1996 (aged 80–81); Way's Mills, Quebec, Canada
- Occupations: Writer, Holocaust survivor
- Notable work: Auschwitz: True Tales from a Grotesque Land (1985)

Sara Nomberg-Przytyk (10 September 1915 – 1996) was a Polish Jewish writer, journalist, and Holocaust survivor. She is best known for her memoir Auschwitz: True Tales from a Grotesque Land (1985), which chronicles her experiences as a prisoner in the Auschwitz concentration camp.

== Early life ==
Sara Nomberg-Przytyk was born on 10 September 1915 in Lublin, Congress Poland. Raised in a Hasidic Jewish family, she was deeply affected by the poverty and antisemitism she witnessed from an early age. Her grandfather was a Talmudic scholar, and her religious upbringing informed her initial worldview, though she later became involved in communist youth movements.

She attended a gymnasium (secondary school) in Lublin before moving to Warsaw to study. There, she became active in left-wing politics, which led to her imprisonment by the Polish authorities for several years in the mid-1930s. Released at the outbreak of the Second World War, she sought refuge in the Soviet-occupied territories, settling in Białystok.

== Experiences in the Holocaust ==
When Operation Barbarossa brought German forces into Białystok in June 1941, Nomberg-Przytyk and the local Jewish population were forced into the Białystok Ghetto. She remained there until its liquidation in August 1943, after which she was deported to the Stutthof camp and eventually transferred to Auschwitz-Birkenau in January 1944.

In Auschwitz, she worked as an attendant in the camp infirmary. This role brought her face to face with notorious figures such as Dr. Josef Mengele—the so-called “Angel of Death.” She survived the death march from Auschwitz in January 1945 and was ultimately liberated by Soviet forces near Rostock in May 1945.

== Career and writing ==
After the war, Nomberg-Przytyk returned to Poland, married, and worked as a teacher and journalist, initially supporting the communist government. Over time, she grew disillusioned with the same antisemitic attitudes and political repression she had hoped communism would eliminate.

Her first book, Kolumny Samsona (The Columns of Samson), published in 1966, documented the destruction of the Białystok Ghetto and the fate of its Jewish community. During the 1960s, she completed a second manuscript—an account of her time in Auschwitz—but Polish censorship policies prevented its publication if it included explicit references to Jewish suffering.

Amid an antisemitic campaign in 1968, Nomberg-Przytyk left Poland, depositing her unpublished Auschwitz manuscript at the Yad Vashem archives in Jerusalem. After living briefly in Israel, she emigrated to Quebec, Canada in the 1970s. In 1980, Holocaust researcher Eli Pfefferkorn discovered her Polish-language Auschwitz account in the Yad Vashem archives. It was eventually translated and published in English in 1985 as Auschwitz: True Tales from a Grotesque Land, bringing Nomberg-Przytyk’s testimony to an international audience.

== Notable works ==
- Kolumny Samsona (1966) – A memoir of the Białystok Ghetto, describing the Jewish resistance and the unfolding of Nazi persecution in Białystok.
- Auschwitz: True Tales from a Grotesque Land (1985) – A collection of autobiographical stories detailing the author’s experiences in Auschwitz, including encounters with Dr. Mengele.
- Communist Poland: A Jewish Woman’s Experience (2022) – Edited by Holli Levitsky and Justyna Włodarczyk; an English edition of Nomberg-Przytyk’s postwar memoir and oral testimony.

== Legacy and influence ==
Sara Nomberg-Przytyk’s writings are regarded as significant contributions to Holocaust literature and testimony. Scholars value her firsthand depictions of life in the Białystok Ghetto and Auschwitz, especially from a woman’s perspective. Her refusal to censor explicit references to Jewish suffering underscores the tension survivors faced under repressive regimes. Today, her works are widely cited by historians, educators, and literary scholars, ensuring that her eyewitness accounts remain part of the historical and cultural record.

Nomberg-Przytyk settled in Montreal, where she continued to write until her death in 1996.
