= Coco Schumann =

German musician and Holocaust survivor

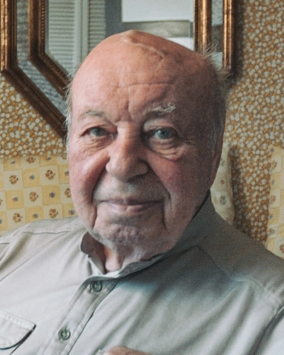
- Schumann in 2012

Background information
- Born: Heinz Jakob Schumann; 14 May 1924; Berlin, Free State of Prussia, Weimar Republic
- Died: 28 January 2018 (aged 93) Berlin, Germany
- Genre: Jazz
- Occupations: Musician, bandleader, writer
- Instrument: Guitar
- Years active: 1940's – 2018

Heinz Jakob "Coco" Schumann (14 May 1924 – 28 January 2018) was a German jazz musician and Holocaust survivor. He became a member of the Ghetto Swingers while transported to Theresienstadt at the age of nineteen. In the aftermath of the Holocaust, Schumann performed as a jazz guitarist, with Marlene Dietrich, Ella Fitzgerald, and Helmut Zacharias.

== Early life ==
Schumann was born in Berlin, Germany, into a bourgeois family. His father, Alfred Schumann, was a war veteran. German by ethnicity and Christian by upbringing, he converted to Judaism after marrying his Jewish wife. Schumann's mother, Hedwig (née Rothholz), was a hairdresser who worked at her father's salon. His nickname, "Coco," came from his French girlfriend who could not pronounce his first name. Schumann became passionate about Swing jazz after having heard it during the Berlin Olympics. During his teenage years, he played for various swing bands and taught himself to play guitar and drums.

== Holocaust years ==
Schumann was transported first to Theresienstadt at the age of nineteen, where he became a member of the Ghetto Swingers. Finally he and Martin Roman were transported to Auschwitz, where he came face to face with Josef Mengele. When Mengele inquired of the blue-eyed, nineteen-year-old Schumann where he came from and what he did, Schumann shouted, "Berlin, Herr Obersturmbannführer! Plumber, Herr Obersturmbannführer!"

Just a few days before the end of the Nazi regime, Schumann contracted spotted fever that had killed hundreds of co-prisoners, and he spent weeks fighting high fevers and delirious nightmares. He and one other man were the only ones to survive the illness. When he was finally able to return home to Berlin, he learned that his grandparents, aunts, uncles, and cousins had been murdered in the camps. However he found his parents alive, as his father had ingeniously succeeded in keeping his Jewish wife hidden from the Nazis by declaring her dead after a disastrous fire.

== Career ==
After the war, Schumann became a celebrated jazz guitarist. In 1950, he left Germany for Australia along with his family before returning to Berlin in 1954. He played with Marlene Dietrich, Ella Fitzgerald, and Helmut Zacharias, among others, before founding his own Coco Schumann Quartet. Schumann's eventful and colorful life is a subject of and is celebrated in a German-language true-to-life color graphic novel by Caroline Gille and Niels Schröder. His autobiography, The Ghetto Swinger: A Berlin Jazz-Legend Remembers, was first published in 1997 and became a bestseller. In 2012 it was staged as a musical in Hamburg.

His French girlfriend gave him his "Coco" nickname after she struggled with the pronunciation of "Jakob".

In reflection to his years in a concentration camp, Schumman recalled: "I am a musician who was imprisoned in concentration camps," Schumann said in later years, adding: "Not a concentration camp prisoner who plays music".

Schumann, who had been filmed in Theresienstadt in 1944 as part of a German documentary, Theresienstadt, was featured in a 2013 documentary called Refuge in Music, about the life of Jewish musicians, composers and artists under the Third Reich.

== Death ==
Schumann died in Berlin on 28 January 2018 at the age of 93.
