= Stella Zylbersztajn-Tzur =

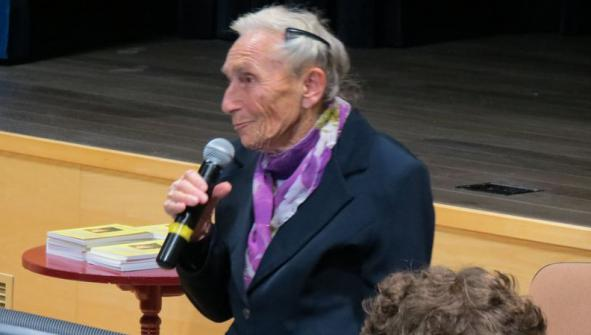
- Stella Zylbersztajn-Tzur in Łosice, 2015.
- Born: 29 November 1925 (age 100); Łódz
- Occupation: Activist
- Known for: Holocaust survivor

Stella Zylbersztajn-Tzur (born 29 November 1925) is a Holocaust survivor, a Polish woman of Jewish parentage who contributed to the honoring of 23 Poles with the title Righteous Among the Nations by Yad Vashem. She was a Carmelite nun before she left Poland and also for several years in Israel. She was working as a nurse in Israel, nowadays, she is an activist.

== Biography ==
Zylbersztajn-Tzur was born and raised in Łódz, attending one of the most expensive all-girl schools, the Eliza Orzeszkowa High School, where the majority of pupils were Jews. Her father Szulim was a communist. In 1939, before World War II began, he had left to the USSR working as an activist and German teacher. He prepared an accommodation and intended to bring his family, but Stella's mother – Haya – was against leaving the country. In her diaries, Stella often emphasized with Polish patriotism of her mother, a common reason of conflict between her parents. Ultimately, their move to the USSR was thwarted by the German Invasion of Poland and train blockade by the Wehrmacht.

In December 1939 Stella's mother decided to move to the USSR because of the increasing antisemitic repressions. Both of them managed to get to the border village of Sarnaki upon the Bug river. They got through to Łosice looking for shelter, where Stella's uncle was an inn-keeper before the War. Stella was placed in Łosice Ghetto at the age of 15. She was able to escape it during its liquidation on August 22, 1942. The majority of Jews from Łosice Ghetto, including Stella's mother, were murdered in Treblinka.

Zylbersztajn-Tzur survived the war hidden by more than twenty Polish families from Łosice and surrounding villages. She was baptized after World War II. She took her school-leaving exam and in August 1948 she became a Carmelite Sister. She spent 24 years in the nunnery.

In 1969, she moved to Israel after experiencing anti-Semitic prejudices even in the religious community. She stayed in Haifa. She was expelled from the Carmelite nunnery for leaving. Then she became a nurse in a residential home. She helped a lot of Poles in finding a job, when large numbers of Polish emigrants shown in Haifa (what is confirmed by multiple statements).

Nowadays, Zylbersztajn-Tzur is helping drug addicts, the homeless and ill, despite her advanced age. She is also an activist in the organization "Women in Black" uniting Israeli and Palestinian women. Stella Zylbersztajn-Tzur is still Catholic, what she emphasizes in many interviews in Poland.

== Credits ==
Zylbersztajn-Tzur contributed to the awarding of 23 Poles that helped her during the war with the title Righteous among the Nations by Yad Vashem.

Zylbersztajn-Tzur's first Righteous were:

– in 1981:

- Aniela Kalicka
- Wacław Radzikowski
- Irena Romaniuk
- Ezechiel Romaniuk
- Halina Ługowska
- Zygmunt Ługowski
- Józefa Zdanowska
- Andrzej Zdanowski
- Stanisław Zdanowski
- Rozalia Wielogórska
- Franciszek Wielogórski
- Józefa Ułasiuk
- Jan Ułasiuk
- Janina Mróz
- Stanisław Mróz
- Władysława Piotrowska
- Helena Kaźmerczak-Gruszka
- Lucyna Piechowicz
- Marian Piechowicz
- Józefa Radzikowska
- Józef Zbuccki
- Anna Radzikowska

– in 1994:

- Wacława Jezierska

== Legacy and commemoration ==
In 2015 biographical movie "Stella" was directed by Maciej Pawlicki about her life. The Official ceremony and projection of the movie was organized in the Presidential Palace in presence of Stella Zylbersztajn-Tzur and president of Poland Andrzej Duda in March 2016.

The film "Stella" was awarded with Janusz Krupski's Award (nagroda im. Janusza Krupskiego) on VII Festiwal Filmowy "Niepokorni Niezłomni Wyklęci" in Gdynia, 2015.

== Autobiography ==
In 1994, Zylbersztajn-Tzur's diary, A gdyby to było Wasze dziecko? …:wspomnienia antysemitki w getcie, komunistki w klasztorze, uniwersalistki wśród Ludu Wybranego, Umiłowanego was released by the publishing house Oficyna Bibiofilów.
