= Solomon Radasky =

Holocaust survivor (1910–2002)

- Born: May 17, 1910; Warsaw, Congress Poland, Russian Empire
- Died: August 4, 2002 (aged 92); Overland Park, Kansas, U.S.

Solomon Radasky (May 17, 1910 – August 4, 2002) was a Holocaust survivor. He was born in Warsaw, Congress Poland, on May 17, 1910, but grew up in the city smaller city of Praga, near the Vistula river. While in Poland before World War II, Radasky owned a small tailor shop where he made fur coats for a living. His life was much like many Polish citizens until the Holocaust in 1941. He and his direct family, like many victimes of the Holocaust, were of Jewish heritage. As the lone survivor of his family of 78 people, he later in life shared his account with historians of how he was able to survive many multiple camps of the worst concentration camps including Auschwitz, Dachau, Gross-Rosen, and the Warsaw Ghetto.

== World War II, the Warsaw Ghetto and the Nazi Camps ==
According to his account, one morning on his way to work at his shop, he was stopped by German police who arrested him for being Jewish. Radasky was a successful 31 years old, law-abiding, Jewish, citizen and businessman and had never broken the law. Soon after bd, his family was also taken, and together were forced into the Warsaw Ghetto by the Germans. They were among the roundup of all Jewish people among other “undesirables” targeted by the Nazi government which included political dissidents, Soviet citizens and Prisoners of war, disabled individuals, Homosexual individuals and Jehovah’s Witnesses.

At first, Radasky was forced to clear snow from the railroad tracks; as an efficient worker, he built up a good reputation among the German soldiers. After disclosing his prior career as a tailor, he was moved to a shop making jackets for the German officers. Meanwhile, his father, mother and elder sister were all killed in the ghetto while he was sent away. His mother and sister were shot on the spot when some Germans asked the mother if she had any jewelry and she said no. His father was caught smuggling food at the gates and shot in consequence.

On April 19, 1943, the Warsaw Ghetto Uprising began and was fought for 63 days, the longest operation by any European resistance group during World War II. Almost all the inhabitants were killed; Radasky, one of the few survivors, was shot in the ankle. The Germans moved the few remaining Jews to work and death camps. His remaining two sisters and brothers were put on a train to Treblinka, and he was put on a train to Majdanek. They were separated because Treblinka could only receive 10,000 prisoners in one trip, and there was around 20,000 total. He never saw them again.

At Majdanek, Radasky reports being forced to walk barefoot three kilometers to and from work every day. His ankle was still healing from his gunshot wound, which a former doctor in the camp was able to operate on with only a pocket knife. He could not limp at all, however, for fear of being removed from his job and killed with the others who could not work (women, children, elderly, sick etc.). Once another worker smoked a cigarette and a German officer saw the smoke. He came riding around on his horse and demanded to know who did it; nobody answered. He then selected 10 “dogs” as they called them, because they wore tags with numbers, to be hanged, including Radasky. According to his report, they were on the gallows with the noose fastened around their necks, seconds away from being executed, when another German soldier screamed: “Halt!” He possessed documents containing orders for three groups of 750,000 workers to be transferred to other camps; Radasky was part of that second group. He was subsequently transferred to Auschwitz.

Upon arrival, there was a selection process in which many people were selected to be machine-gunned in a field. He, however, was selected to be a worker and taken to get a number tattooed on his arm (128232). He reports being sent to work at numerous camps including Buna, Gross-Rosen, and Dachau. As the Americans advanced closer and closer to the camps the Germans put everyone on trains into the mountains. Finally, on May 1, 1945, the Americans caught up to the train outside a small town named Tutzing and liberated the prisoners.

== Post-war and later life ==
Once restored to good health, Radasky headed to a town in Germany, Feldafing, where many liberated people went after the war in hopes of finding friends and family. He found an old friend whose girlfriend’s family had been patrons of his shop. He was then introduced to her friend, Frieda, who became his wife in November 1946. They had a son born May 13, 1948. They were able to move to the United States in 1949 and settled in New Orleans, Louisiana. He could not speak English, but was able to demonstrate his skill at a local fur shop. Out of the 78 people in his extended family, Solomon was the only survivor.

In 1961, Radasky was one of the organizers of a counter-protest of New Orleans survivors in a New Americans Club against Neo-Nazis led by George Lincoln Rockwell at the Civic Theatre for the local premiere of Exodus, debating the local Anti-Defamation League chapter which wished to maintain a low profile during the event. He lived in New Orleans with his two children and his wife until he moved to a retirement community in Overland Park, Kansas; he died at age 92 on August 4, 2002.

== Interview with Radasky ==
Radasky's experiences have been shared at the United States Holocaust Memorial Museum as well as has been covered by historians, most notably with his experiences in Auschwitz.

- https://collections.ushmm.org/search/catalog/irn504800
