= Fritz Weiss =

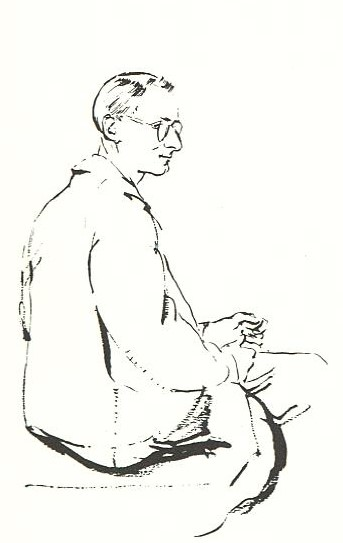
- Born: 28 September 1919; Prague, Czechoslovakia
- Died: 28 September 1944 (aged 25); Auschwitz-Birkenau, German-occupied Poland
- Occupations: Jazz musician and arranger

Fritz Weiss (Czech: Bedřich Weiss) (28 September 1919 – 28 September 1944) was a Czech jazz musician and arranger, active in the first half of the 20th century. He was an organizer of jazz performances and an important participant in the musical life of the Theresienstadt concentration camp. Weiss was murdered in the Holocaust.

== Biography ==
=== Early years ===
A poster for a music performance of Fritz Weiss Quintet (among others) in the Theresienstadt concentration camp, created by K. Heřmann.

Weiss was born into a middle-class German-speaking Prague family of Jewish origin. He became interested in jazz at an early age, and soon began to participate in the jazz life of Prague.

He started to play violin, but later switched to trumpet. As a student of the Prague English Grammar School he became a member of the school orchestra called Swing Rhythm, where he played first trumpet. Playing in the orchestra he met a significant exponent of Czech jazz, Karel Vlach.

Among the members of the orchestra were Germans, Czechs and Jews; the bandleader was Czech pianist Milan Halla. The situation changed in 1939, with the rise of Nazism. Some of the German musicians left the ensemble, because they did not want to play with Jews.

In 1939, Weiss moved to the newly founded Karel Ludvík Orchestra. He played first trumpet, but his performing with the band was more and more problematic because of racial laws.

He was finally forced to leave the orchestra. However, he anonymously participated in the recording of gramophone records. As a member of the Karel Ludvík Orchestra, Weiss became a bandleader and helped to organize rehearsals, but above all, he arranged the major part of the repertory of the ensemble.

The Jewish jazz musicians used to practice 1940–1941 in the Jewish Orphanage.

=== Theresienstadt ===
On the 4 December 1941 Fritz Weiss was sent, as part of the second Aufbaukommando, to the Theresienstadt concentration camp. He was on transport J that took 1000 people from Prague to Theresienstadt. He took part in musical events held in the camp, and he even continued his collaboration with orchestras outside of the camp. With the help of Czech police officers he managed to obtain music paper and scores needed for arranging jazz compositions. He later secretly sent his arrangements out of the camp. He collaborated mainly with Arnošt Kavka, the singer of the Karel Vlach Orchestra. In Theresienstadt, Weiss founded his own quintet, active up to August 1944. In 1943 he also became an artistic leader and arranger of the Theresienstadt Dixieland ensemble called Ghetto Swingers. Both bands collaborated in various performances and the number of musicians increased, especially following the arrival of Danish and Dutch Jewish jazz players. Weiss, together with Berlin pianist Martin Roman, composed and arranged more than thirty new compositions for the ensembles. The most popular composition was the jazz arrangement of the children's opera Brundibár, originally composed by Hans Krása. In June 1944, during the visit of the Red Cross to the camp, the Ghetto Swingers were forced to participate in the propaganda performance organized by Kurt Gerron, coerced by the Germans to deceive the outside world. The ensemble also appeared in the propaganda movie The Fuhrer Gives a City to the Jews, made during this event.

In September 1944, Fritz Weiss's father was sent in the transport to the Auschwitz extermination camp. His son joined him and stayed with him during the selection. Both father and son were murdered in the gas chambers of Auschwitz. Fritz Weiss was murdered in Auschwitz on 28 September 1944, the day of his 25th birthday.

== Recordings ==
- In Defiance of Fate. Compositions arranged by Fritz Weiss for the Emil Ludvík Orchestra. Unique recordings from 1940–41. Jewish Museum in Prague, 2003. [CD]. ŽMP006.
