= Mirjam Bolle-Levie =

Dutch-Israeli Holocaust survivor and centenarian (born 1917)

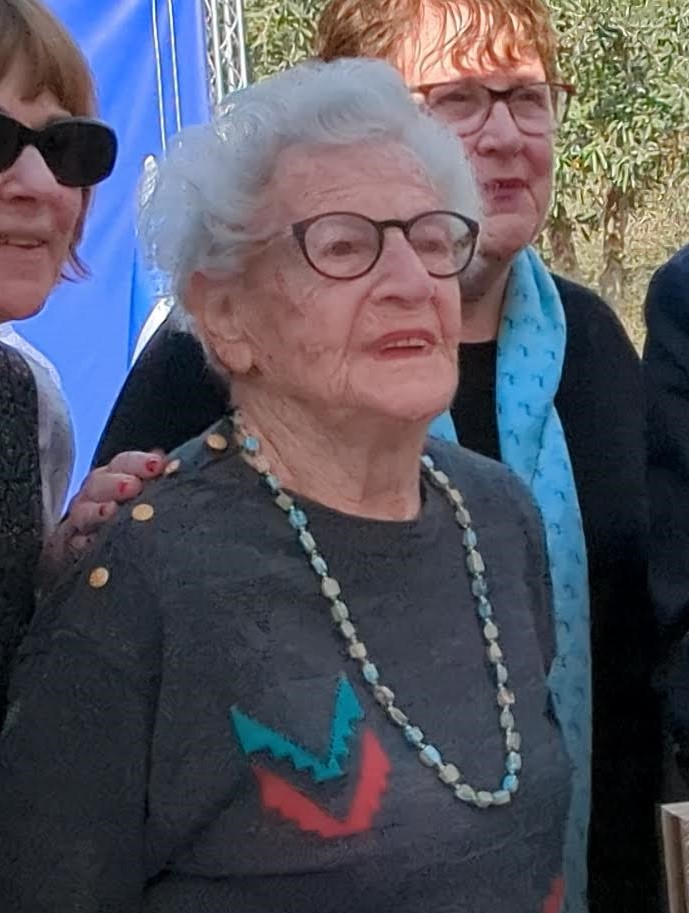
- Bolle-Levie in 2024
- Born: Mirjam Sophie Levie; 20 March 1917 (age 109); Amsterdam, Netherlands

Mirjam Bolle-Levie (born 20 March 1917) is a Dutch-Israeli Holocaust survivor and centenarian. Following the death of Rose Girone in 2025, Bolle-Levie became the oldest living Holocaust survivor.

== Early life ==
Mirjam Sophie Levie was born on 20 March 1917 in Amsterdam, Netherlands.

== World War II ==
In 1943, Levie was taken to Westerbork transit camp, before being deported to Bergen-Belsen concentration camp in January 1944.
