= Henriette Cohen =

Holocaust survivor

- Born: 17 August 1917; Marseille, France
- Died: 25 June 2019 (aged 101); Marseille, France
- Other name: Henriette Bensadon

Henriette Cohen (1917 – 2019) was a Nazi concentration camp survivor. She died at the age of 101.

Cohen née Bensadon was born on 17 August 1917 in Marseille. She was arrested in a Gestapo raid in May 1944 and then sent to a Nazi concentration camp. Sources differ on if she was held at Auschwitz concentration camp or Bergen-Belsen concentration camp.

Cohen survived at returned to France and her husband and two children, who survived in hiding. She had four more children.

Cohen died on 25 June 2019 in Marseille. Obituaries refer to her as France’s oldest Auschwitz survivor.
