= Henry Golde =

Author and Holocaust survivor

- Born: Heniek Golde; May 5, 1929; Płock, Poland
- Died: October 18, 2019 (aged 90); Appleton, Wisconsin, U.S.
- Occupations: Author, educator
- Known for: Holocaust survival and testimony
- Notable work: Ragdolls

Henry M. Golde (May 5, 1929 - October 18, 2019) was an author and childhood survivor of the Holocaust. He wrote about his experiences in his book Ragdolls.

== Biography ==
Golde was born in Płock, Poland located west of Warsaw. At the age of 11, he was taken by the SS to the district of Galicia, Poland. There, he was spared from the gas chambers when selected as fit for a work camp. He spent the next five years in nine different Nazi concentration camps in Poland, Germany, and Czechoslovakia.

Golde survived starvation, typhoid fever, and a two-week death march to Czechoslovakia, eventually losing his entire family due to the war. He was liberated from the Theresienstadt concentration camp by the Russians and was then placed in a children's home for four months. Golde spent seven years in England, including two years in the Royal Navy, before emigrating to the United States.

He later resided in Appleton, Wisconsin until his death on October 18, 2019.

In 2008, Golde received an award for outstanding educator of the year from the Wisconsin State Human Relations Association.
