= Isaac Zieman =

Latvian psychoanalyst

Isaac Zelig Zieman (May 6, 1920 – April 2, 2007) was a Latvian psychoanalyst. He was a survivor of both the Holocaust and Stalin's gulag (labor camps) who devoted his life to helping people as a psychoanalyst and an advocate for peace between the Germans and Jews, Israelis and Palestinians, and other groups with a history of antagonism.

== Early life and Zionism ==
Born as the first of four children to the Zieman family in the shtetl (small, traditional Jewish community) of Livani in Latvia. Isaac's middle-class, Yiddish-speaking Orthodox Jewish family owned a small grocery store. As a ten-year-old Isaac joined Gordonia, a Zionist-socialist youth group with its plans for European Jews to move to Palestine to create a modern Hebrew-speaking Jewish homeland. This commitment created tension with his family. His dreams of creating a just, secular state in the Biblical land of "milk and honey" would be a major motivation in his life.

== Education ==
As a child Zieman was educated in Hebrew. In Germany after World War II he was trained in psychoanalysis and in 1967 earned a master's degree from New School University. He spoke seven languages: English, German, Hebrew, Latvian, Polish, Russian, and Yiddish—with varying levels of fluency. Because he arrived in the English-speaking world in later life, after his education was interrupted by war, Stalin's labor camps, and the Holocaust, Zieman's facility with written English was limited.

== Caught between Hitler and Stalin ==
The Russians invaded and occupied Latvia in 1940 and the Germans invaded it a year later. Upon the later invasion Isaac joined a group of anti-Hitler partisans, which soon collapsed. He then fled to the part of Russia that was not yet occupied and enlisted in the Soviet Army. His flight from Latvia would in the end save his life since it kept him out of the reach of the Nazis’ genocidal machine. His life changed on 13 May 1942, during World War II, when Stalin decreed that people born in "capitalist" (noncommunist) countries could no longer fight in the Red Army. He was transferred from Stalingrad to forced labor in a Siberian coal mine. This decree may have saved his life, as he was about to fight in the battle for Stalingrad where the victorious Soviet Army suffered over a million casualties. Conditions in the Soviet forced labor camp were horrendous. When due to meager rations he was on the verge of exhaustion and starvation, Isaac was sent to the infirmary where his food provisions were cut: he begged for food to stay alive. After a few months, authorities in Moscow gave permission for him to travel to Kyrgyzstan, a Central Asian Soviet Republic, where he worked in a variety of jobs including laboring on a small collective farm. When he became depressed and went to a Soviet psychiatrist, he was encouraged to find a direction in life, a goal. His secret plan was to escape the Soviet Union and establish a Jewish homeland in Palestine. When he was mobilized to work in a military factory, he studied Polish from a book at night. Again, he volunteered for the Soviet Army, which he subsequently deserted, devising a purely fictional story of being a Pole on the way to Poland. After numerous interrogations by the Soviet police he was referred to a group of Poles heading to their homeland to join the Polish army. In all he assumed five different identities to help him navigate through World War II. In the Polish army he taught soldiers how to operate a tank and rose to the rank of sergeant. After the collapse of Nazi Germany he went west, working for the Gordonia organization in displaced persons (DP) camps in Austria and Germany to assist other Holocaust survivors to prepare to emigrate to Palestine. He felt destined to join them and live on a Kibbutz growing oranges until he discovered that his entire family was murdered, prompting a severe depression. After a year, and being unable to work, he again reached out for professional help.

== Psychoanalyst and peace builder ==
Zieman studied psychoanalysis in Munich and moved to America with his second wife and had a son and daughter. He channeled his survivor experiences, guilt, and skills into a meaningful and constructive life. His drive to help his downtrodden fellow human beings manifested itself in his activism in the Civil Rights Movement and other causes. Most of Zieman's influence in the English-speaking world was through oral contact and word-of-mouth. He lectured and ran workshops for Holocaust survivors and children of the Nazis primarily in Germany and America, although he did speak to some audiences with a broader focus, such as at the Psychohistory Forum in New York City.

== Influence ==
Some of the specific groups he worked through were the Dialogue Project, the Generation After and Holocaust Survivors Association, and the One by One reconciliation group.

== Zieman's universal and Jewish lessons of the Holocaust ==
- Never to forget the victims of this heinous crime of mass murder of innocent people.
- Jews should have a Jewish country that would be able to rescue and absorb Jews who would be in danger or suffering anywhere in the world.
- God created all human beings and that people should endeavor to improve the world by practicing justice, compassion, and peace.
- The importance of studying and teaching all the factors that made the holocaust possible.
- That negative generalizations about an ethnic or religious groups are dangerous.
- The Holocaust showed us that one can be a good husband, wife, a lover of animals, like Hoess, the commandant of Auschwitz, and at the same time, order and supervise the murder of thousands of innocent human beings. The Holocaust demonstrated the human capacity for splitting.
- The Holocaust disproved the Enlightenment belief that science and technology would make people happy, because it showed that science and technology could also be used for heinous mass murder of innocents.
- The Holocaust showed the lack of value of traditional education for the prevention of mass inhumanity to men, women and children.

== Publications ==
- Isaac Zieman, "Jewish and Universal Lessons from the Holocaust" Clio's Psyche Vol. 13 No. 4, pp. 197–199.
