= Anne Skorecki Levy =

Polish–American educator and activist

- Born: July 1935 (age 91); Łódź, Poland
- Occupations: Teacher, activist

Anne Skorecki Levy (born July 1935) is an American educator and activist. A child Holocaust survivor, she is best known for her protest efforts against Louisiana State Representative David Duke over his Holocaust denial. Levy used her own Holocaust experiences to confront Duke in his runs for senate and governor. These confrontations inspired the political strategy used by the Stop Duke Movement and the Louisiana Coalition Against Racism and Nazism in Duke's run for Governor against Edwin Edwards in 1991, which was to expose Duke's Nazi and white supremacist leanings. Biographer Lawrence Powell notes, "Anne Levy shows how one person can become the moral compass for a movement." Levy continues her work to this day as an educator for the Southern Institute for Education and Research and the National World War II Museum in New Orleans.

== Early life ==
Anne was born in July 1935 to Mark Skorecki and Ruth Tempelhof in Łódź, Poland, the oldest of three children, including Lila, and a brother, Adam, born after the War. On September 1, 1939, Germany invaded Poland. Like many men of military age, her father fled to the east, believing that Nazi invaders would not mistreat women and children. But in March 1940, Ruth and her daughters were forced into the Łódź Ghetto. A few months later, with Mark's long-distance help, they escaped, only to land in the Warsaw Ghetto. By now Mark had reunited with his family, finding work as a shop foreman in one of the ghetto's largest slave factories. (Miraculously, the entire family survived intact despite the ruthless emptying of the Warsaw Ghetto in the summer of 1942.)

Using papers that identified them as Catholic, Ruth and her daughters escaped to the so-called Aryan side, where Mark joined them shortly before the Warsaw Ghetto exploded in rebellion. Initially hidden by the Piotrowskas, a Catholic mother and her daughter, the Skoreckys changed their hiding place when an antisemitic neighbor threatened them with exposure. The rest of the war they spent sheltering in the lumber yard attached to the plant in which Mark had been working under a false identity. After liberation, the family fled Russian-occupied Poland for the American Zone of Occupation in eastern Bavaria.

Levy and her family arrived in New Orleans in 1949 where they permanently settled with the help of the National Council of Jewish Women as part of the Port and Dock Program, a citywide interdenominational resettlement project.

== Confronting David Duke ==
In June 1989, Levy confronted newly elected Louisiana House Representative David Duke at the opening of a Holocaust exhibition in the rotunda of the Louisiana State Capitol. Because the opening was also a press event, her confrontation was caught on camera and replayed on television.

Elizabeth Rickey, a member of the Republican State Central Committee from New Orleans, credited Anne Levy as her inspiration in holding a press conference showing the Neo-Nazi books that she had purchased from Duke's Metairie legislative office. Rickey said, "I started dragging my feet… and I was a little afraid of Duke as well, but then I thought if Anne Levy has got the guts to walk up to that man and ask him why he said the Holocaust never happened, I certainly could summon the courage to expose his Nazi book-selling operation… I want to back her up.” Levy used her story to continuously confront Duke in his run for senate against J. Bennett Johnston in 1990 and again when Duke ran for governor against Edwin Edwards in 1991.
