= Veliko Polje, Sežana =

Veliko Polje
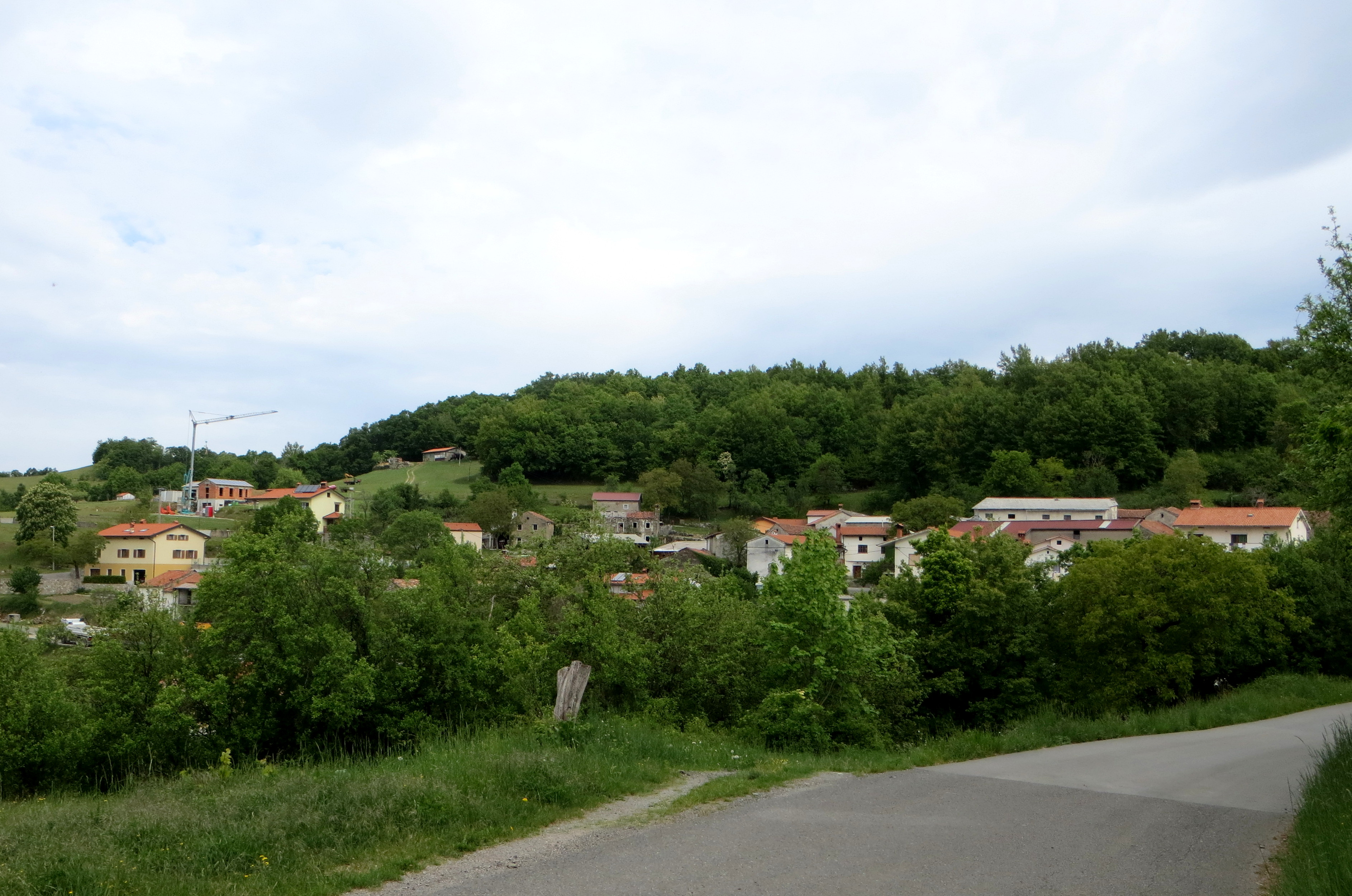

- Location in Slovenia
- Coordinates: 45°46′1.46″N 13°58′39.83″E
- Country: Slovenia
- Traditional region: Littoral
- Statistical region: Coastal–Karst
- Municipality: Sežana

Area
  - Total: 5.39 km^{2} (2.08 sq mi)
- Elevation: 556.1 m (1,824 ft)

Population (2002)
  - Total: 62

Veliko Polje (pronounced [ˈʋeːlikɔ ˈpoːljɛ], locally also [ʋɛˈliːkɔ -]; German: Großpule, Italian: Poglie Grande) is a small settlement northwest of Dolenja Vas in the traditional Inner Carniola region of Slovenia. It is now generally regarded as part of the Slovenian Littoral. It lies within the Municipality of Sežana.
