= Martin Roman =

German jazz pianist

- Born: April 23, 1910; Germany
- Died: May 12, 1996; Germany
- Occupation: Jazz pianist
- Known for: Holocaust survivor; Theresienstadt ghetto musician

Martin Roman (23 April 1910 – 12 May 1996) was a German Jewish jazz pianist and Holocaust survivor.

At the time of the Reichstag fire in February 1933, Martin was stopped by SS men at the entrance to the huge Vaterland emporium in Berlin, where his band, the Marek Weber Band, was employed. He left for the Netherlands. In January 1944 Roman was transported to Theresienstadt concentration camp.

In the summer of 1944, he was forced to participate in a propaganda film in Theresienstadt which the commandant Karl Rahm had coerced the actor Kurt Gerron to direct. Roman appeared leading his Ghetto Swingers. When the filming was over Roman and Gerron were sent to Auschwitz, where Gerron perished.

Like jazz drummer and guitarist Coco Schumann, Roman survived. Gerron and clarinetist Fritz Weiss of the Jazz-Quintet-Weiss did not.

Roman's "Wir reiten auf hölzernen Pferden" was recorded on the album Terezín - Theresienstadt, by Anne Sofie von Otter.
