= Richard Rudolph (concentration camp survivor) =

German Holocaust survivor

Richard Rudolph (June 11, 1911 – January 31, 2014) was the last surviving victim of "double persecution" in that he was incarcerated for nearly nine years in Nazi prisons and concentration camps and then was imprisoned for a further ten years in the communist German Democratic Republic (East Germany). He was imprisoned in Sachsenhausen, Neuengamme, and Ravensbrück concentration camps and the Salzgitter-Watenstedt Leinde subcamp of Neuengamme in addition to various police, penitentiary and juvenile prisons.

Grounds for his imprisonment and persecution in the Nazi era were his stand as a conscientious objector, for which he barely escaped being executed on several occasions, and his beliefs as a Jehovah's Witness. Jehovah's Witnesses supported neither Nazi racist and militaristic policies nor communist suppression of religion. Rudolph's experiences have been documented in the book Im Zeugenstand: Was wir noch sagen sollten, 100 Fragen—900 Antworten, Interviews mit Holocaust-Überlebenden und NS-Opfern, released in English as Taking the Stand: We Have More to Say, 100 Questions—900 Answers, Interviews with Holocaust Survivors and Victims of Nazi Tyranny, by Bernhard Rammerstorfer, an author and film producer regarding Holocaust subject matter.
