= Ordnung muss sein =

German proverbial expression

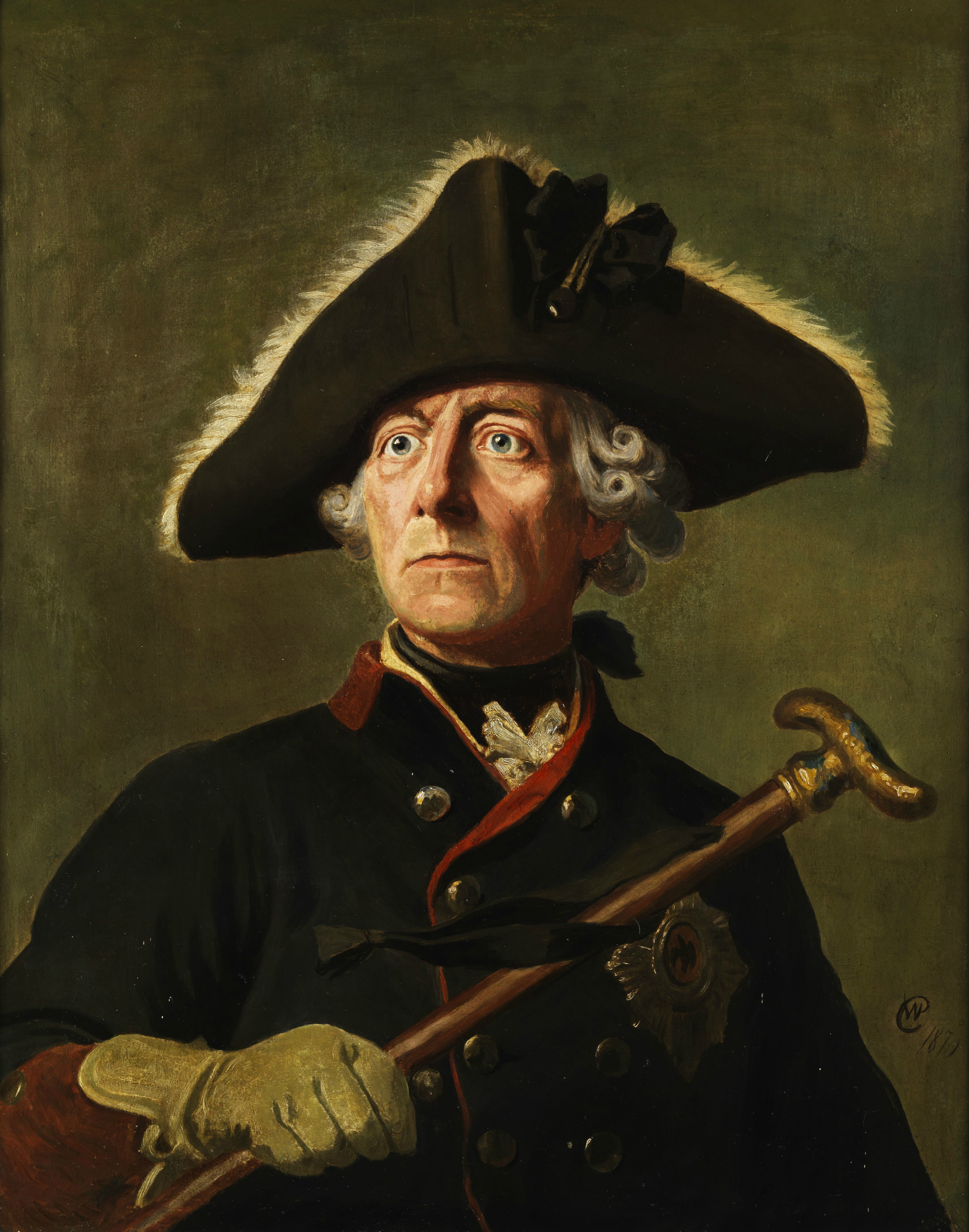
Portrait of Frederick the Great, absolute monarch of the Kingdom of Prussia

"Ordnung muss sein" (reformed) or "Ordnung muß sein" (traditional) is a German proverbial expression which translates as "there must be order". The idea of "order" is generally recognized as a key cliche for describing German culture. Franz von Papen, for instance, cited it in 1932 as Frederick the Great's "classic expression". As a slogan used by Paul von Hindenburg, it became "world famous" in 1930, according to The New York Times. A longer version is contained in a mid-19th century collection of proverbs where the title is a Wellerism: Ordnung muß sein, sagte Hans, da brachten sie ihn ins Spinnhaus (in English: "Order must be, said Hans, as they took him to the prison").

Related German proverbs are Ordnung ist das halbe Leben, literally "order is half of life", humorously extended in the antiproverb und Unordnung die andere Hälfte ("and disorder the other half"). Similarly, a proverb says Wer Ordnung hält, ist nur zu faul zum Suchen meaning "he who keeps order is just too lazy to spend his time searching".

Present interpretation of the expression distorts its original meaning. The expression was introduced by Martin Luther as Ordnung muss sein unter den Leuten ("Order must be among people"), Ordnung in the sense of True Law of God as opposed to human rules, for Orden und Regeln sind nichts ("Orders and rules are nothing") (on the same page) and Liebe zu Geld ... ist nicht Gottes Werk oder Ordnung (Love for money ... is not God's work or Ordnung).

There is an Ordnungsamt (Public Office for Order, code enforcement) in every German municipality and city. Minor or petty offenses are called Ordnungswidrigkeiten, meaning "contravention" or "offense", in the sense of "contrarity to (public) order", similar to the American term "disorderly conduct".

== In popular culture ==
The proverb forms part of the title of an early 2000s German television sitcom, Hausmeister Krause – Ordnung muss sein, set in a Cologne housing development and starring Tom Gerhardt as Hausmeister Krause, a janitor with an authoritarian streak.

== See also ==
- Ordnungsbehörde
- Ordnungspolizei
