= List of victims and survivors of Auschwitz =

This is a list of notable victims and survivors of the Auschwitz concentration camp; that is, victims and survivors about whom a significant amount of independent secondary sourcing exists. This list represents only a very small portion of the 1.1 million victims and survivors of Auschwitz and is not intended to be viewed as a representative or exhaustive count by any means.

== Victims ==
Male victims are signified by a Pale Turquoise background. Female victims are signified by a Light Pink background.

Name	Born	Died	Age	Ethnicity	Notability
Estella Agsteribbe	April 6, 1909	September 17, 1943	34	Jewish	Gymnast. Member of the gold medal-winning Dutch gymnastics team at the 1928 Summer Olympics.
Heinz Alt	1922	January 6, 1945	22 or 23	Jewish	Composer. Deported from Theresienstadt Ghetto to Auschwitz on September 28, 1944.
Jan Ančerl	February 28, 1943	c. October 15, 1944	1	Jewish	Son of Karel Ančerl and Valy Ančerl. Born while parents were in Theresienstadt Ghetto.
Valy Ančerl	1908	c. October 15, 1944	36	Jewish	Wife of Karel Ančerl, who was also at Auschwitz, but survived.
Count Andreas Pius Cyrill of Zoltowski-Romanus Andreas Pius	1881	September 4, 1941	59	Polish	Noble.
Ana Balog	27 February 1930	1945	15	Uruguayan Jewish	Born in Uruguay to Hungarian immigrant parents; her mother was Orthodox Jewish and her father a Christian convert to Judaism. At the time of the Nazi invasion of Hungary, she was staying with her maternal grandmother in Nyírmeggyes, from where both were deported.
Norbert Barlicki	June 6, 1880	September 27, 1941	61	Polish	Lawyer, publicist, and politician.
Count Bernard of Łubieński	February 23, 1894	October 10, 1941	47	Polish	Noble. Was a member of the Polish Ministry of Commerce and Industrial Affairs before war broke out. Belonged to the first group of people to organise the underground fight.
Fritz Löhner-Beda	June 24, 1883	December 4, 1942	59	Jewish	Austrian librettist, lyricist and writer. Born Bedřich Löwy. On 1 April 1938, almost immediately after the Anschluss (the annexation of Austria by Nazi Germany, in mid-March 1938), Fritz Löhner-Beda was arrested and deported to the Dachau concentration camp. On 23 September 1938 he was transferred to the Buchenwald concentration camp.On 17 October 1942 Löhner-Beda was deported to the Monowitz concentration camp, near Auschwitz. Beaten to death for not working hard enough .
Asher Anshil Weiss	1882	June 1944	62	Jewish	Rabbi of the NadiPalo community in the Siladi Galilee district of Transylvania. During the Holocaust he was sent to the Shamluya ghetto, from where he was sent to the Auschwitzdeath camp, where he was murdered together with his wife Rachel
René Blum	March 13, 1878	c. September 1942	64	Jewish	Choreographer, founder of the Ballet de l'Opéra; brother of Léon Blum. Transferred to the camp on September 23, 1942.
Hana Brady	May 16, 1931	October 23, 1944	13	Jewish	Arrived at the camp on October 23, 1944, and was gassed immediately.
Bronisław Czech	July 25, 1908	June 4, 1944	35	Polish	Skier – 24 times Polish champion, and participant of Winter Olympics of 1928, 1932 and 1936; soldier of Armia Krajowa.
Lea Deutsch	March 18, 1927	May 1943	16	Jewish	Child actress. Born Jewish, converted to Roman Catholicism with her family in June 1941 as an attempt by her father to save the family from certain death, but still considered Jewish by Nazi racial laws. Died in the cattle wagon routed to Auschwitz.
Barend Dresden-Polak	May 14, 1908	November 30, 1944	36	Jewish	Husband of Anna Dresden-Polak and father of Eva Dresden, both of whom were killed at Sobibor on July 23, 1943.
Fritz Duschinsky	February 26, 1907	December 1, 1942	35	Jewish	Czechoslovak physicist
Michel Epstein		November 6, 1942			Husband of Irène Némirovsky. Arrived on November 6, 1942, and was gassed immediately.
Hertha Feiner	1896	March 12, 1943	47	Jewish	Among last Jewish employees to leave Berlin. Put on train to Auschwitz on March 12, 1943; poisoned herself in transit.
Benjamin Fondane	November 14, 1898	October 2, 1944	45	Jewish	Poet, critic, existentialist philosopher and author.
Lina Fondane	1892	1944	52	Jewish	Sister of Benjamin Fondane.
Edith Frank	January 16, 1900	January 6, 1945	44	Jewish	Mother of Anne Frank; arrested on 4 August 1944; deported to Auschwitz 3 September 1944. She died of weakness and disease on 6 January 1945.
Miroslav Šalom Freiberger	January 9, 1903	May 8, 1943	40	Jewish	Head Rabbi of Jewish Municipality of Zagreb, catechist, translator, writer and spiritual leader, educated in law and theology science. On last transport of Jews from Croatia. Killed at camp entrance when he protested against the inhumane procedure that was implemented against the members of his community.
Edward Galiński	May 10, 1923	September 15, 1944	21	Polish	Publicly executed at the camp after an escape attempt, with his lover, Mala Zimetbaum.
Kurt Gerron	May 11, 1897	October 28, 1944	47	Jewish	Actor and film director; was either persuaded or coerced by the Nazis to make a propaganda film showing how humane the conditions were at Theresienstadt Ghetto. After filming finished, he was deported on the final transport ever to Auschwitz, on October 28, 1944, and was gassed immediately.
Dora Gerson	March 23, 1899	February 14, 1943	43	Jewish	Cabaret singer and silent-film actress. Gassed with her husband Max Sluizer and children Miriam Sluizer and Abel Juda Sluizer
Petr Ginz	February 1, 1928	September 28, 1944	16	Jewish	Writer. Esperantist.
Ala Gertner	March 12, 1912	January 5, 1945	32	Jewish	Smuggled gunpowder into the camp to help the Sonderkommando blow up Crematorium IV during an October 7, 1944 revolt. Tortured and eventually executed by hanging along with her three conspirators, the last public hanging at Auschwitz.
Pavel Haas	June 21, 1899	October 17, 1944	45	Jewish	Composer. After arrival at the camp, Josef Mengele was about to send Karel Ančerl to the gas chamber, but weakened Haas, who stood next to him, began to cough and the death sentence was therefore chosen for him instead.
Jane Haining	June 6, 1897	August 16, 1944	47	Scottish	Scottish missionary working in Hungary since 1932. Arrested by the Nazis in 1944 on charges of espionage and working among Jews while trying to save young Jewish girls. Arrested and sent to prisons in Fő utca and Buda, and then sent to Auschwitz in May 1944, where she was tattooed as prisoner 79467.
Eddy Hamel	October 21, 1902	April 30, 1943	40	Jewish (American)	American soccer right winger (AFC Ajax).
Etty Hillesum	January 15, 1914	November 30, 1943	29	Jewish	Diarist and writer.
Ivana Hirschmann	May 5, 1866	May 8, 1943	77	Jewish	Croatian first female professor of gymnastics.
Lilli Jahn	March 5, 1900	c. June 19, 1944	44	Jewish	Doctor who gained international fame posthumously following the publication of her letters to her five children which she wrote during her imprisonment in the labor camp Breitenau.
Tobias Jakobovits	November 23, 1887	October 29, 1944	56	Jewish	Rabbi, Czech librarian, and historian of Czech-Jewish culture
Regina Jonas	August 3, 1902	October 12 or December 12, 1944	42	Jewish	First ordained female rabbi in Germany, rabbi at Neue Synagoge in Berlin, killed two months after entering the camp.
Itzhak Katzenelson	July 1, 1886	May 1, 1944	57	Jewish	Teacher, poet, dramatist; his son Zvi Katzenelson was on the same transport and was killed the same day as Itzhak.
Peter Kien	January 1, 1919	c. October 16, 1944	25	Jewish	Artist, poet and librettist active in Theresienstadt Ghetto (Terezín), died from infectious disease soon after arrival to Auschwitz on October 16. Wife and parents were on same transport and were killed.
Bereck Kofman	October 10, 1900	1943	42	Jewish	Hasidic orthodox rabbi, deported to Auschwitz from Drancy internment camp on Convoy No. 12 on July 29, 1942. According to survivor, he was at the camp for one year before his murder by a Kapo on a Shabbat because he refused to work. He was beaten up with a pickax and buried alive. Father of French philosopher Sarah Kofman.
Saint Maximilian Kolbe	January 8, 1894	August 14, 1941	47	Polish	Saint. Conventual Franciscan friar who volunteered to die in place of Polish Army Sergeant Franciszek Gajowniczek, who was a stranger to him.
Gertrud Kolmar	December 10, 1894	March 1943	48	Jewish	Writer, used the pen name of Gertrud Kolmar (born Gertrud Käthe Chodziesner).
Hans Krása	November 30, 1899	October 17, 1944	44	Jewish	Composer; helped to organize cultural life in Theresienstadt Ghetto.
Egon Kunerwalder					First husband of Stephanie Helbrun (married 1942). Deported to the camp with his wife in December 1943. Threw himself on the electric wire surrounding the camp in 1944.
Steffi Kunke	December 26, 1908	February 14, 1943	34	Austrian	Teacher and socialist involved in the anti-fascist underground in Vienna, some sources say she died of typhus while others that she was beaten to death by SS Obersturmbannführer Otto Koegel
Rutka Laskier	1929	1943	14	Jewish	Teenager who wrote a diary. Her writings were posthumously published. Dubbed the "Polish Anne Frank".
Rudolf Levy	July 15, 1875	January 1944	68	Jewish	Painter and student of Henri Matisse.
Henri Lévy	June 7, 1883	August 13, 1942	59	Jewish	Rabbi. He was deported on Convoy No. 8 to the camp on July 20, 1942.
Donat Makijonek	May 19, 1890	June 18, 1941	51	Polish	World War I ace; KZ Number 16301.
Franceska Mann	February 4, 1917	October 23, 1943	26	Jewish	Arrived at the camp on October 23, 1943, killed after she stabbed SS Oberscharführer Walter Quakernack and then shot SS Oberscharführer Josef Schillinger (died of wounds) and SS Sergeant Emmerich.
Count Mauritz of Potocki		1942		Polish	Noble.
Jan Mosdorf	May 30, 1904	October 11, 1943	39	Polish	Right-wing politician, director of the nationalist organization All-Polish Youth and member of political party National Radical Camp. Killed for helping Jews in the camp.
Bernard Natan	July 14, 1886	October 1942	56	Jewish	Film director and actor and former head of Pathé Film Studios. Arrived at the camp on September 25, 1942, and was killed several weeks later.
Irène Némirovsky	February 11, 1903	August 17, 1942	39	Jewish	Novelist. She was classified as a Jew under the Nazi racial laws, which did not take into account her conversion to Roman Catholicism.
Józef Noji	September 8, 1909	February 15, 1943	33	Polish	Track and field athlete and participant of the 1936 Summer Olympics in Berlin. Murdered by the camp's SS guard, allegedly for trying to smuggle a letter.
Felix Nussbaum	December 11, 1904	August 9, 1944	39	Jewish	Painter (surrealist). Entire family was eventually killed at the camp at different times, with the exception of one brother, who died from exhaustion at Stutthof in December 1944.
Karl Pärsimägi	May 11, 1902	July 27, 1942	40	Estonian	Painter (Fauvist). Unknown circumstances as to why he was sent to Auschwitz. It may have been his sexuality, or possibly because he was aiding the Resistance, or helping hide Jewish friends.
Saint Grigol Peradze	September 13, 1899	December 6, 1942	43	Georgian	Saint. Priest, ecclesiastic figure, theologian, historian, Archimandrite, PhD of history, professor.
Maurice Perl				Jewish	Father of Gisella Perl. Brought his prayer book into the gas chamber.
Roza Robota	1921	January 5, 1945	23	Jewish	Smuggled gunpowder into the camp to help the Sonderkommando blow up Crematorium IV during an October 7, 1944 revolt. Tortured and eventually executed by hanging along with her three conspirators, the last public hanging at Auschwitz.
Alma Rosé	November 3, 1906	April 5, 1944	37	Jewish	Head of an orchestra of female prisoners who played for their captors
Horst Rosenthal	August 10, 1915	September 11, 1942	27	Jewish	German-born French cartoonist of Jewish descent; detained in the Gurs internment camp in Vichy France on 28 October 1940; transferred to Auschwitz on 11 September 1942 and executed on the same day; best known for his comic book Mickey au Camp de Gurs he created while held in Gurs.
Marcin Rożek	November 4, 1885	May 19, 1944	58	Polish	Sculptor and painter. Died of exhaustion in the camp infirmary.
Chaim Rumkowski	February 27, 1877	August 28, 1944	67	Jewish	Nazi-appointed head of the Judenrat while he lived in the Łódź Ghetto in Poland. He was known to abuse his power, such as by molesting young Jewish women within the ghetto. executed by Jewish Resistance for his actions in the Łódź Ghetto; Family was also killed at the camp.
Roman Rybarski	July 3, 1887	March 6, 1942	54	Polish	Economist, historian and politician connected with the right-wing National Democracy political camp. Executed by shooting for organizing the resistance movement in the camp.
Regina Safirsztajn	1915	January 5, 1945	30	Jewish	Smuggled gunpowder into the camp to help the Sonderkommando blow up Crematorium IV during an October 7, 1944 revolt. Tortured and eventually executed by hanging along with her three conspirators, the last public hanging at Auschwitz.
Erich Salomon	April 28, 1886	July 7, 1944	58	Jewish	Photographer (news).
Rafael Schächter	May 25, 1905	January 1945	39	Jewish	Composer, pianist and conductor. Helped to organize cultural life in Theresienstadt Ghetto. Died on the death march.
Malva Schalek	February 18, 1882	March 24, 1945	63	Jewish	Painter. Was transported to the camp on May 18, 1944, and was killed soon afterwards.
Mommie Schwarz	July 28, 1876	November 19, 1942	66	Jewish	Painter. Killed with his wife Else Berg.
Otto Selz	February 14, 1881	August 27, 1943	62	Jewish	Psychologist and professor, formulated the first nonassociationist theory of thinking, in 1913. Was transported to the camp on August 24, 1943.
Lavoslav Singer	1866	1942	76	Jewish	Known Bjelovar industrialist.
Ludmila Slavíková	1890	1943	53	Czech	Mineralogist
Rosa Stallbaumer	November 30, 1897	November 23, 1942	44–45	Jewish	Wife of Anton Stallbaumer; both were members of the Austrian Resistance.
Saint Edith Stein	October 12, 1891	August 9, 1942	50	German	Saint. Philosopher and nun. Born into a Jewish family, considered a "Catholic Jew" (of Jewish heritage, but baptized and practiced Catholicism, considered Jewish by Nazi racial laws).
Ettie Steinberg	January 11, 1914	September 4, 1942	28	Jewish	One of few Irish Jews who died in the shoah; gassed with her husband Vogtjeck Gluck and son Leon Gluck
Robert Stricker	August 16, 1879	October 28, 1944	65	Jewish	Member of the Austrian Parliament; publisher of the Jewish weekly magazine Die Neue Welt, Killed with his wife on arrival at Auschwitz
Prince Ludwik Swiatopelk-Czetwertynski	1876 or 1877	May 3, 1941	64	Polish	Noble.
Tadeusz Tański	March 11, 1892	March 23, 1941	49	Polish	Automobile engineer and the designer of the first Polish serially-built automobile, the CWS T-1. Arrested on July 3, 1940, and sent to the camp.
Carlo Taube	July 4, 1897	October 1, 1944	47	Jewish	Composer, conductor and pianist. From Galicia, active in Prague. Taube, his wife Erika and their child were deported from Prague to Theresienstadt Ghetto on December 10, 1941. They were deported to Auschwitz on October 1, 1944, where all three were killed immediately.
Erika Taube	1913	October 1, 1944	30	Jewish	Wife of Carlo Taube.
Yissachar Shlomo Teichtal	February 9, 1885	January 24, 1945	59	Jewish	Rabbi author of Eim HaBanim Semeicha
Viktor Ullmann	January 1, 1898	October 18, 1944	46	Jewish	Composer, conductor, pianist, teacher, music critic, active in Prague. Deported to Theresienstadt Ghetto on September 8, 1942, where he helped to organize cultural life. Transferred to Auschwitz on October 16, 1944.
Clara de Vries	December 31, 1915	October 22, 1942	26	Jewish	Dutch jazz trumpeter, was transported to Auschwitz on October 19 and was murdered on October 22.
Estusia Wajcblum		January 5, 1945			Smuggled gunpowder into the camp to help the Sonderkommando blow up Crematorium IV during an October 7, 1944 revolt. Tortured and eventually executed by hanging along with her three conspirators, the last public hanging at Auschwitz.
Froukje Esther Waterman-Hollander	October 25, 1915	February 28, 1943	27	Jewish	Daughter of Han Hollander and Leentje Hollander-Smeer, both of whom were killed at Sobibor on July 9, 1943.
Ilse Weber	January 11, 1903	October 6, 1944	41	Jewish	Gassed with her son Tomas.
Árpád Weisz	April 16, 1896	January 31, 1944	47	Jewish	Football (soccer) player and manager.
Sarah Wiesel	1905	May 1944	39	Jewish	Mother of Elie Wiesel. Gassed immediately.
Tzipora Wiesel		May 1944		Jewish	Younger sister of Elie Wiesel. Gassed immediately with her mother.
Rosette Wolczak	March 19, 1928	November 23, 1943	15	French Jewish	Deported from Switzerland for "immorality".
Mala Zimetbaum	January 26, 1922	September 15, 1944	22	Jewish	Deported to the camp on Transport #10 on September 15, 1942. Inmate #19880. Her proficiency in several languages allowed her to work as an interpreter in the camp. Publicly executed at the camp after an escape attempt, with her lover, Edward Galiński.

- Hedwig Dulberg (7 January 1894 – 1944), German artist
- Simon Okker (1 June 1881 – 6 March 1944), Dutch Olympic fencer.
- Lion van Minden (10 June 1880 – 6 September 1944), Dutch Olympic fencer.
- Max Scheuer, Jewish Austrian footballer.
- Rosette Wolczak, (1928–1943), died in KZ Auschwitz

== Survivors ==
Name	#	Born	Died	Age	Ethnicity	Imprisoned	Notability
George Able							Met Annetta Helbrun when both were assigned to a commando loading corpses. Later married Annetta in 1948.
Magda Ádám		October 15, 1925	January 27, 2017	91	Jewish		Historian. Except for 2 sisters, family was murdered
Vera Alexander					Jewish		Witnessed crimes committed by Irma Grese.
Karel Ančerl		April 11, 1908	July 3, 1973	65	Jewish	October 15, 1944	Conductor. Josef Mengele was about to send Ančerl to the gas chamber, but a weakened Pavel Haas, who stood next to him, began to cough and the death sentence was therefore chosen for him instead. Helped to organize cultural life in Theresienstadt concentration camp.
Yehuda Bacon		July 28, 1929	Alive	97	Jewish	December 1943 – January 18, 1945	Artist. Sent on the death march. His father was gassed in June 1944; his mother and his sister Hanna were deported to Stutthof concentration camp, where they died a few weeks before its liberation.
Else Baker		December 18, 1935	Alive	90	Romani	April 1944 –August 1944	Detained at Auschwitz in April 1944. Transported to Ravensbrück concentration camp in August 1944, and was rescued in September of that year by her adoptive father, Emil Matulat, who was not Romani, who pleaded with authorities to rescue his daughter.
Władysław Bartoszewski	4427	February 19, 1922	April 24, 2015	93	Polish	September 22, 1940 – April 8, 1941	Member of Armia Krajowa. Released from camp due to actions by Polish Red Cross. Minister of Foreign Affairs of Poland (twice) after 1989.
Eugeniusz Bendera	8502	1 January 1921	7 July 1988	67	Ukrainian	– June 20, 1942	Auto mechanic, from Chortkiv. On June 20, 1942, he escaped from Auschwitz.
Jerzy Bielecki	243	28 March 1921	October 20, 2011	90	Polish		Political prisoner. Suffered hanging torture (arms hung behind back).
Tadeusz Borowski		November 12, 1922	July 1, 1951	28	Polish	1943–late 1944	Writer. Transferred to Natzweiler-Struthof, then to Dachau concentration camp; committed suicide after the war.
George Brady		February 9, 1928	January 11, 2019	98	Jewish	October 23, 1944 – January 18, 1945	Plumber. Sent on the death march; escaped when a Soviet tank blew a hole in the building he was in. His mother, father and sister Hana were gassed at the camp.
Boris Braun		August 20, 1920	January 11, 2019	106	Jewish	1943 – January 17, 1945	University professor. His mother and father were killed during the Holocaust. Sent on the death march.
Libuša Breder					Jewish		Worked in the "Canada" sector of the camp. Witnessed rapes of women by the camp's officers.
Eva Brewster		December 28, 1922	December 3, 2004	81	Jewish (German)	April 1943 – January 1945	Author of Vanished in Darkness – An Auschwitz Memoir.
Stefania Budniak	72307	July 12, 1912	July 16, 1982	70	Polish	December 19, 1943 – August 1944	Member of the Polish resistance, sentenced to Auschwitz in her husband's place. She was transferred to Ravensbrück, then to Helmsbrecht (55131), and finally Zwodau and liberated on May 7, 1945.
Thomas Buergenthal		May 11, 1934	May 29, 2023	92	Jewish		Human rights champion, former judge of the International Court of Justice, author of A Lucky Child, interned at Auschwitz-Birkenau and Sachsenhausen.
Alice Lok Cahana		February 7, 1929	November 28, 2017	88	Jewish	1944	Deported from Sárvár. Abstract painter.
Helena Citrónová		26 August 1922	4 June 2007	84	Jewish	26 March 1942 - January 27, 1945	Worked in the "Canada" sector of the camp. An SS officer, Franz Wunch, fell in love with her. As a result, Wunch would later save Helena's sister from the gas chambers, although her sister's son and daughter could not be saved.
Józef Cyrankiewicz	62933	April 23, 1911	January 20, 1989	77	Polish	September 4, 1942 – ?	Later Prime Minister of Poland and Chairman of the Polish Council of State.
Ryszard Dacko					Polish		Political prisoner.
Bat-Sheva Dagan	45554	September 8, 1925	January 25, 2024	98	Jewish	May 1943 – January 1945	Kindergarten teacher, psychologist, author. Worked in camp infirmary and in the "Canada" commando. Survived death march to Ravensbrück and Malchow concentration camps in January 1945, and death march to Lübz, where she was liberated on May 2, 1945.
Alex Dekel							Served under Josef Mengele as his subject, witnessing many of Mengele's human medical experiments.
Yehiel De-Nur	135633	May 16, 1909	July 17, 2001	92	Jewish		Writer.
Robert Desnos		July 4, 1900	June 8, 1945	44	French		French surrealist poet. Died of typhoid in Theresienstadt.
Lucille Eichengreen		February 1, 1925	February 7, 2020	101	Jewish	August 1943 – October 1944	From Hamburg. Deported to Łódź Ghetto on October 26, 1941, where she was molested by Mordechai Chaim Rumkowski. Remained there for two years until deported to Auschwitz. Transferred to Neuengamme concentration camp.
Anna Eilenberg-Eibeshitz		November 5, 1923		103	Jewish		Author
Eliezer Einsenschmidt		1920	Alive		Jewish		
Renée Firestone		April 13, 1924	Alive		Jewish		Her sister was killed at the camp during medical experiments.
Anne Frank		June 12, 1929	February or March 1945	15	Jewish (German)	September 3, 1944 – October 28, 1944	Teenage diarist from Amsterdam, held 7 weeks at Auschwitz, transferred to Bergen-Belsen where she died of Typhus.
Gyuri Frankfurter					Jewish		One of the "Mengele twins" who was selected and used for involuntary medical experiments. From Berettyóújfalu. Emigrated to United States in 1947, name changed to "George".
Laci Frankfurter					Jewish		One of the "Mengele twins" who was selected and used for involuntary medical experiments. From Berettyóújfalu. Emigrated to United States in 1947, name changed to "Leslie".
Tova Friedman	A27633	September 10, 1938	Alive	88	Jewish		Friedman is among the youngest people to survive the Nazi Holocaust
Dario Gabbai	182,568	September 2, 1922	March 25, 2020		Jewish (Greece)	April 1944 – January 18, 1945	Member of Sonderkommando. Family was killed at the camp. Sent on the death march.
Peter Greenfeld	A-2459	1940	Alive		Jewish	1944 – January 27, 1945	One of the "Mengele twins" who was selected and used for involuntary medical experiments. Known at the camp as "Josef "Peipchek" Klineman". Born in Prague.
Stanislaw Hantz		22 January 1923	17 July 2008	80	Polish		Political prisoner.
Annetta Helbrun		February 4, 1924	Alive		Jewish	December 1943 – January 18, 1945	One of the "Mengele twins" who was selected and used for involuntary medical experiments. Born in Subotica, lived in Prague until 1939. Escaped on the death march.
Stephanie Helbrun		February 4, 1924	Alive		Jewish	December 1943 – January 18, 1945	One of the "Mengele twins" who was selected and used for involuntary medical experiments. Born in Subotica, lived in Prague until 1939. Escaped on the death march. Their parents and sister were killed in various camps.
Eugeniusz Hejka	608	October 16, 1918	2009	90	Polish	June 14, 1940 – November 1940	Polish-Catholic soldier punished as an eleventh for escape of Tadeusz Wiejowski, survived.
Stanisław Gustaw Jaster	6438	January 1, 1921	July 12, 1943	22	Polish	– June 20, 1942	Veteran of Invasion of Poland in rank of first lieutenant, from Warsaw. On June 20, 1942, he escaped from Auschwitz.
Wieslaw Kielar		August 12, 1912	June 1, 1990	77	Polish (non-Jewish)		Author of the autobiographical novel Anus Mundi: 5 Years in Auschwitz.
Martha Klineman	A-4931	1940			Jewish	1944 – January 27, 1945	Peter's twin. One of the "Mengele twins" who was selected and used for involuntary medical experiments. Born in Prague.
Eva Mozes Kor	A7063	January 31, 1935	July 4, 2019	84	Jewish	1944 – January 27, 1945	One of the "Mengele twins" who was selected and used for involuntary medical experiments. Both of her parents and two older sisters were killed at the camp; only Miriam and herself survived. Founder of CANDLES Holocaust Museum and Education Center.
Anton Korêk		March 29, 1927	Alive	99	Jewish	October 1943 – January, 1945	Carpenter. His brother was gassed in December 1943. His parents were tortured to death during the Holocaust.
August Kowalczyk		August 15, 1921	July 29, 2012	90	Polish		Political prisoner.
Vera Kriegel							One of the "Mengele twins" who was selected and used for involuntary medical experiments.
Jona Laks	A27700	1930	Alive		Jewish (Polish)	August 1944 – May 8, 1945	One of the "Mengele twins" who was selected and used for involuntary medical experiments. Sent on the death march with her twin sister Miriam (A27725).
Germain Laur	185856	May 31, 1895	March 27, 1952	56	French	April 30, 1944 – January 27, 1945	French Resistance fighter and departmental leader of the Combat movement in Tarn. Arrested in March 1944, deported to Auschwitz-Birkenau, and liberated by Soviet forces in January 1945.
Józef Lempart	3419	1916			Polish	– June 20, 1942	Priest, from Wadowice. On June 20, 1942, he escaped from Auschwitz.
Primo Levi	174517	July 31, 1919	April 11, 1987	67	Jewish (Italian)	February 21, 1944 – January 18, 1945	Was an Italian Jewish chemist and writer. He was the author of several books, novels, collections of short stories, essays, and poems.
Helen Lewis		June 22, 1916	December 31, 2009	93	Jewish	May 1944 – January 1945	Dancer who trained in Prague. Left Auschwitz on a forced march to Stutthof concentration camp in January 1945.
Henryk Mandelbaum	181970	December 15, 1922	June 17, 2008	85	Jewish	April 22, 1944 – January 18, 1945	Part of Sonderkommando. Fled on a death march.
Ibi Mann		October 24, 1924			Jewish		
Józef Mikusz					Polish		Political prisoner.
Miriam Mozes	A7064	January 31, 1935	June 6, 1993	58	Jewish	1944 – January 27, 1945	Eva's twin sister. One of the "Mengele twins" who was selected and used for involuntary medical experiments. Mengele injected Miriam with a chemical that stopped the growth of her kidneys; later, Eva donated one of her kidneys.
Miklós Nyiszli		June 17, 1901	May 5, 1956	54	Jewish	June 1944 – January 18, 1945	Prisoner, and doctor (pathologist) who served Josef Mengele. Sent on the death march.
Józef Paczyński	121	January 20, 1920	April 26, 2015	95	Polish	June 1940 – January 18, 1945	Political prisoner. About every 1 1/2 weeks, he was ordered to cut the hair of the camp's commanding officer, Rudolf Höss. Personally witnessed gassings from nearby.
Gisella Perl	25404	December 10, 1907	December 16, 1988	81	Jewish	1944	Gynecologist. Forced to be an inmate doctor. Saved the lives of hundreds of pregnant women by aborting their pregnancies (pregnant women were often killed for experiments by Josef Mengele). Wrote one of the earliest first-person accounts of life in Auschwitz in her 1948 book, I Was a Doctor in Auschwitz.
Kazimierz Piechowski	918	October 3, 1919	December 15, 2017	98	Polish	June 20, 1940 – June 20, 1942	Imprisoned because the boy scouts were labeled a criminal organization. Deported to camp on second transport from Tarnów. On June 20, 1942, he escaped from Auschwitz I along with 3 other prisoners.
Witold Pilecki	4859	May 13, 1901	May 25, 1948	47	Polish	September 22, 1940 – April 26, 1943	Soldier and secret agent ("Tomasz Serafiński"). He volunteered to be imprisoned at Auschwitz (the only person known to do so) for a Polish resistance operation in order to gather intelligence and escape. As the author of the Witold's report, the first intelligence report on Auschwitz, his operation enabled the Polish government-in-exile to convince the Allies that the Holocaust was taking place. Later executed by communists.
Samuel Pisar		March 18, 1929	July 27, 2015	86	Jewish		Lawyer, writer. His parents and younger sister Frieda were killed during the war. Transferred to Dachau concentration camp. Escaped during a death march.
Otto Pressburger					Jewish		From Trnava. Forced to dig mass graves and exhume corpses. His mother and father were killed at the camp.
Pearl Pufeles							One of the "Mengele twins" who was selected and used for involuntary medical experiments.
Helen Rappaport							One of the "Mengele twins" who was selected and used for involuntary medical experiments.
Ephraim Reichenberg					Jewish		One of the "Mengele twins" who was selected and used for involuntary medical experiments.
Franz Rosenbach		1927	2012	85	Romanian		Survived because he was transferred to another camp. His mother was killed at the camp.
Tadeusz Rybacki					Polish		Political prisoner. Served as a waiter at the SS canteen in the camp.
Lipot Salomon	A-5723	1923 or 1924	April 19, 1965	40	Jewish	May 28, 1944 – January 1945	One of the "Mengele twins" who was selected and used for involuntary medical experiments. Born in Turţ. First deported to Vynohradiv ghetto on April 14, 1944.
Dezo Salomon	A-5724	1923 or 1924	April 22, 1996	71	Jewish	May 28, 1944 – January 1945	One of the "Mengele twins" who was selected and used for involuntary medical experiments. Born in Turţ. First deported to Vynohradiv ghetto on April 14, 1944.
Kazimierz Smoleń	1327	April 19, 1920	January 27, 2012	91	Polish	July 1940– January 18, 1945	Political prisoner. Sent on the death march.
Sigmund Sobolewski	88	May 11, 1923	August 7, 2017	94	Polish	June 14, 1940 – November 7, 1944	Immortalized in the book Prisoner 88: The Man in Stripes.
Lale Sokolov	32407	1916	October 31, 2006	90	Jewish	April 23, 1942 –	Camp Tätowierer (tattooist)
Peter Somogyi	A-17454	April 14, 1933	Alive		Jewish	July 9, 1944 – January 27, 1945	One of the "Mengele twins" who was selected and used for involuntary medical experiments. From Pécs. Their mother and older sister (14 years) were gassed at Auschwitz at arrival.
Thomas Somogyi	A-17455	April 14, 1933	Alive		Jewish	July 9, 1944 – January 27, 1945	One of the "Mengele twins" who was selected and used for involuntary medical experiments. From Pécs.
Zvi Ernst Spiegel		1915	1993	78		– January 27, 1945	Assigned to supervise twins used in the medical experiments of Josef Mengele. Saved children from the gas chamber on several occasions. After the camp's liberation, he took 157 Mengele twins and homeless children to safety in Hungary. 29 years old in 1944.
Pavel Stenkin					Russian		Prisoner of war.
Władysław Szmyt		March 20, 1924	Alive		Polish		Political prisoner.
Władysław Ślebodziński	79053	February 6, 1884	January 3, 1972	87	Polish	December 1, 1942 – January, 1945	Mathematician. Transferred to Gross-Rosen and then to Nordhausen. Later became president of the Polish Mathematical Society and a member of the Polish Academy of Sciences.
Morris Venezia		February 25, 1921	September 2, 2013	92	Jewish	April 11, 1944 – ?	Part of the Sonderkommando. "Watch Full Testimony" on YouTube
Silvia Veselá					Jewish	1942	Deported from holding camp near Bratislava.
Yehuda Aharon Vidovsky		July 25, 1919	September 13, 2026	107	Jewish	September 1, 1944 – ?	Also survived Łódź Ghetto and Groß-Rosen subcamp at Friedland; lost whole family but for one brother. Lived to be 107.
Eva Votavová					Jewish	July 1942	
Rudolf Vrba	44070	September 11, 1924	March 27, 2006	81	Jewish	June 30, 1942 – April 7, 1944	Scientist. Escaped from the camp. Co-author of the Vrba-Wetzler report, delivered to the Allies, which saved the lives of an estimated 120 to 200 thousand Jews. Testified against Adolf Eichmann at Eichmann's trial.
Alfréd Wetzler	29162	May 10, 1918	February 8, 1988	69	Jewish	1942 – April 7, 1944	Escaped from the camp. Co-author of the Vrba-Wetzler report, delivered to the Allies, which saved the lives of an estimated 120 to 200 thousand Jews.
Ingeborg Weiss		June 22, 1922	October 21, 2004	81		1944	Dancer and choreographer. She was Deported to Auschwitz in 1944 and later to Bergen-Belsen, where she contracted typhoid, but recovered.
Elie Wiesel	A-7713	September 30, 1928	July 2, 2016	87	Jewish	May 17, 1944 – January 1945	Writer, professor, political activist, Nobel Peace Prize winner (1986). His mother and younger sister are gassed immediately. Transferred to Buchenwald concentration camp, where Wiesel's father, Shlomo, was beaten and killed. Two older sisters, Hilda and Beatrice, survive.
Eddy de Wind	27903	February 6, 1916	September 27, 1987	71	Jewish	1943 – January 1945	Psychiatrist, psychoanalyst and author who served as a "haftling" doctor in the Auschwitz main camp. He coined the phrase 'concentration camp syndrome', now more generally referred to as 'survivor's guilt' and 'post-traumatic stress disorder'. His memoir, ‘Last Stop Auschwitz’ is the only survivor testimony written in Auschwitz.

- Lucie Adelsberger (1895–1971), German-Jewish physician
- Leo Bretholz (March 6, 1921 – March 8, 2014), Austrian Jew who escaped from train en route, author of Leap into Darkness (1998).
- Tadeusz Debski (1921–2011), Polish survivor, oldest person to receive a doctorate degree at University of Illinois at Chicago.
- Józef Diament (1894–1942), chairman of the Supreme Council of Elders of the Jewish Population of the Radom District. Arrested on charges of economic abuses, he died in the camp.
- Laure Diebold (10 January 1915 – 17 October 1965), French resistant, Compagnon de la Libération.
- Xawery Dunikowski (24 December 1875 – 26 January 1964), Polish sculptor and artist, best known for his Neo-Romantic sculptures and Auschwitz-inspired art.
- Kurt Epstein (January 29, 1904 – February 1, 1975), Czechoslovak Jewish Olympic water polo competitor
- Hans Frankenthal (July 15, 1926 – December 22, 1999), German-Jewish author.
- Viktor Frankl (26 March 1905 – 2 September 1997), Austrian-Jewish neurologist and psychiatrist.
- Hédi Fried (15 June 1924 – 20 November 2022) Hungarian-Jewish (from Sighet), author of The Road to Auschwitz: Fragments of a Life.
- Franciszek Gajowniczek (15 November 1901 – 13 March 1995), Polish Army Sergeant whose life was spared when Maximilian Kolbe took his place. Survived and died in 1995.
- Józef Garliński, Polish best-selling writer who wrote numerous books in both English and Polish on Auschwitz and World War II, including the best selling 'Fighting Auschwitz'. Survived and died in 2005.
- Rena Kornreich Gelissen (24 August 1920 – 8 August 2006), Polish-Jewish (born in Tyliczi), author of Rena's Promise: A Story of Sisters in Auschwitz, survived.
- Leon Greenman (18 December 1910 – 7 March 2008), British anti-fascism campaigner. Survived and died in 2008. Author of An Englishman in Auschwitz.
- Nicholas (Miklós) Hammer,(1920–2003), Hungarian-born Jew, who was placed in Auschwitz I block 6 and worked in the Kanada I section. Subject of the biography Sacred Games by Gerald Jacobs. Unusual as he was in labour, concentration and death camps before being liberated.
- Magda Hellinger
- Magda Herzberger (February 20, 1926 – April 23, 2021), Romanian-Jewish author and poet.
- Philomena Franz (1922 - 2022), Sinti writer and activist
- Joseph Friedenson (1922–2013), Polish-Jewish (from Łódź), editor of Dos Yiddishe Vort.
- František Getreuer (1906–1945), Czech swimmer and Olympic water polo player, killed in Dachau concentration camp
- Hugo Gryn (25 June 1930 – 18 August 1996), senior rabbi, London.
- Adélaïde Hautval (1 January 1906 – 17 October 1988), French psychiatrist who refused to cooperate with medical experimentation at Auschwitz.
- Stefan Jaracz (24 December 1883 – 11 August 1945), Polish actor and theater director who survived camp but died of tuberculosis in 1945.
- Imre Kertész (9 November 1929 – 31 March 2016) Hungarian writer, Nobel Laureate in Literature for 2002.
- Stanisław Kętrzyński (10 September 1878– 26 May 1950) Polish historian and diplomat.
- Gertrude "Traute" Kleinová (August 13, 1918 – April 9, 1976), Czechoslovak Jew, 3-time table tennis world champion.
- Antoni Kocjan (12 August 1902 – 13 August 1944), Polish glider constructor and a contributor to the intelligence services of the Polish Home Army. Murdered by Gestapo in 1944.
- Zofia Kossak-Szczucka (10 August 1889 – 9 April 1968), Polish writer and World War II resistance fighter, co-founder the wartime Polish organization Żegota. Released through the efforts of the Polish underground.
- Henri Landwirth (March 7, 1927 – April 16, 2018), Belgian philanthropist and founder of Give Kids the World (survived).
- Joel Lebowitz (born May 10, 1930), Mathematical Physicist. Survived. Honors include the Boltzmann Medal, Henri Poincaré Prize, and Max Planck Medal.
- Olga Lengyel (19 October 1908 – 15 April 2001), Hungarian-Jewish author of Five Chimneys (1946), survived.
- Curt Lowens (17 November 1925 – 8 May 2017), German-Jewish actor and resistant, survived.
- Arnošt Lustig (21 December 1926 – 26 February 2011), Czechoslovak and later Czech Jewish writer and novelist, the Holocaust is his lifelong theme, survived.
- Branko Lustig (10 June 1932 – 14 November 2019), Croatian-American film producer.
- Edward Mosberg (1926–2022), Polish-American Holocaust survivor, educator, and philanthropist
- Filip Müller (1922–2013) inmate no. 29236, survivor and author of Eyewitness Auschwitz: Three Years in the Gas Chambers (1979).
- Alfred "Artem" Nakache (1915 – 1983), French swimmer, world record (200-m breaststroke), one-third of French 2x world record (3x100 relay team), imprisoned in Auschwitz, where his wife and daughter were killed.
- Igor Newerly (1903–1987), Polish novelist and educator.
- Bernard Offen (born 1929), Polish documentary filmmaker working in Poland and the United States to create Second Generation Witnesses.
- Ignacy Oziewicz (1887–1966), Polish army officer, first commandant of Narodowe Sily Zbrojne
- Lev Rebet (1912–1957) Ukrainian nationalist ideologist.
- Bernat Rosner (born 1932), Hungarian-Jewish lawyer, co-author of An uncommon friendship. Survived.
- Vladek Spiegelman (1906–1982) Father of Art Spiegelman, author of Maus. Vladek Spiegelmann was the central character in Maus.
- Anja Spiegelman, (1912–1968), Mother of Art Spiegelman, author of Maus.
- Józef Szajna (1922–2008) Polish scenery designer, stage director, playwright, theoretician of the theatre, painter and graphic artist.
- Leon Schiller, (1887–1954), Polish theater and film director, critic and theoretician. He was also a composer and wrote theater and radio screenplays.
- Sigmund Strochlitz (1916–2006), Polish-American activist, confidant of Eli Wiesel, and served on the U.S. Holocaust Memorial Council (1978–86)
- Menachem Mendel Taub (1923–2019), rabbi of Kaliv.
- Jack Tramiel (1928–2012), Polish-born businessman, founder of Commodore International. Rescued by the U.S. Army in April 1945.
- Rose Van Thyn (1921–2010), Auschwitz and Ravensbrueck survivor who directed Holocaust education activities in her adopted city of Shreveport, Louisiana.
- Simone Veil, née Simone Annie Jacob (1927–2017), French politician, survived.
- Shlomo Venezia (1923–2012), Greek-Jewish (born in Thessaloniki), author of Inside the Gas Chambers: Eight Months in the Sonderkommando of Auschwitz, survived.
- Rose Warfman (née Gluck) (1916–2016), French nurse, member of the French Resistance.
- Stanislaw Wygodzki (1923–2012), Polish-Jewish author, survived.

== See also ==
- List of victims of Nazism

== Bibliography ==
- Snješka Knežević, Aleksander Laslo (2011). Židovski Zagreb. Zagreb: AGM, Židovska općina Zagreb. ISBN 978-953-174-393-8.
- Miodrag Savkovitch, Emerih Mike (1926). Zbirka portreta i biografija znamenitih ljudi kraljevstva Srba, Hrvata i Slovenaca. Vienna: Union – Stephen A. Schwarzman Building / Slavic and Baltic Division.
