= Dębski =

Dębski ([ˈdɛmpski]; feminine: Dębska; plural: Dębscy) or Debski is a Polish-language surname. It is sometimes written Dembski due to its pronunciation. The surname may refer to:

- Eugeniusz Dębski (born 1952), Polish writer and translator
- Jakub Dębski (born 1988), Polish cartoonist, comic author, and YouTuber
- Krzesimir Dębski (born 1953), Polish composer
- Rafał Dębski (born 1969), Polish writer
- Sławomir Dębski (born 1971), Polish historian
- Tadeusz Debski (1921–2011), Polish survivor of the Nazi concentration camps
- Zbigniew Dębski (1922–2010), member of the Polish army

== See also ==
- Dembski
- Demski
