= Sacred Games =

Sacred Games may refer to:

- Sacred Games (biography), a 1995 book by Gerald Jacobs
- Sacred Games (novel), a 2006 novel by Vikram Chandra.
  - Sacred Games (TV series), a 2018 streaming television series by Netflix based on Chandra's novel
  - Sacred Games (soundtrack), soundtrack album of 2018 streaming television series

== See also ==
- Ancient Olympic Games, considered sacred by the ancient Greeks
- Sacred (video game)
- Thiruvilaiyadal (lit. 'Divine Game'), a 1965 Indian Hindu mythological film by A. P. Nagarajan based on the Hindu text Thiruvilaiyadal Puranam
