= Leo Bretholz =

Holocaust survivor

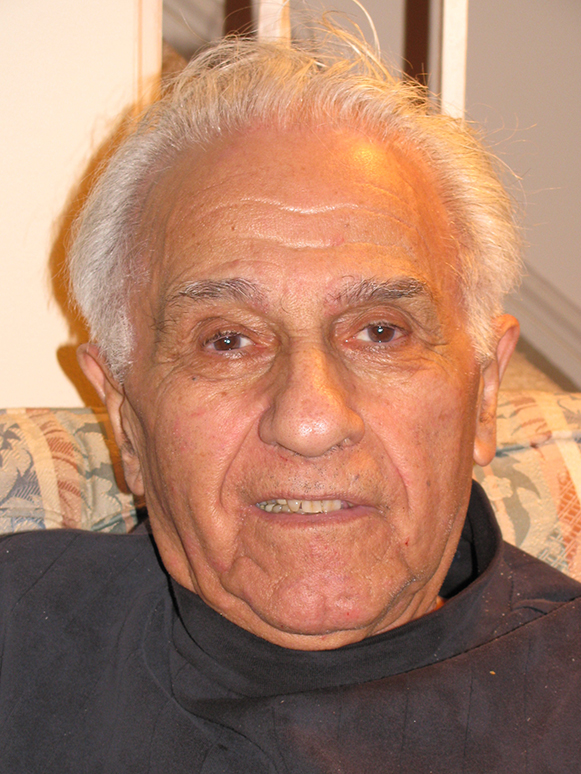
- Born: March 6, 1921; Vienna, Austria
- Died: March 8, 2014 (aged 93); Pikesville, Maryland
- Spouse: Florine Cohen (m. 1952–2009; her death)
- Children: Three

Leo Bretholz (March 6, 1921 – March 8, 2014) was a Holocaust survivor who, in 1942, escaped from a train heading for Auschwitz. He has also written a book on his experiences, titled Leap into Darkness.

He escaped seven times during the Holocaust.

== Life ==
Leo Bretholz was born in Vienna, Austria, on March 6, 1921. His father, Max Bretholz, was a Polish immigrant who worked as a tailor and died in 1930. His Mother, Dora (Fischmann) Bretholz, also Polish, was born in 1891 and worked as a seamstress. He had two younger sisters, Henny and Edith (Ditta).

After the Anschluss in March 1938, many of his relatives were arrested. At his mother's insistence, Bretholz fled on a train to Trier, Germany, where he was met by a smuggler. He swam across the Sauer River into Luxembourg, where he spent five nights in a Franciscan monastery. Bretholz was arrested two days later in a coffee shop and chose to be taken to the Belgian border over arrest or being sent back to Germany. On November 11, 1938, he arrived in Antwerp, Belgium, where he stayed for a peaceful eighteen months, and went to a public trade school to become an electrician as an alternative to being sent to an internment camp. During that time, Bretholz learned to speak Dutch. On May 9, 1940, he entered a hospital in Antwerp to have surgery on a hernia, but Antwerp was bombed the next morning before he could be operated on. Upon being discharged from the hospital, he was arrested as an enemy alien. Now that the war had reached Antwerp, being an Austrian – and thus, because of the Anschluss, German – citizen, Bretholz became an enemy to Belgium. He was sent to St. Cyprien, an internment camp near the Spanish border. His friend Leon Osterreicher came to visit him and instructed him to escape by climbing under the camp's fence. While living with distant relatives nearby, he was sent to an assigned residence in Cauterets, France, near the Pyrenees Mountains, where he stayed for eight to ten months until on August 26, 1941, when the deportation began from this town. Upon a warning from the mayor of Luchon, he hid with his uncle overnight in the Pyrenees, returning the next day to find half of the ghetto's population deported. With his cousin Albert Hershkowitz he walked across the Swiss border in October 1942 under the name Paul Meunier, only to be stopped by a Swiss mountain patrol and sent back to France. There he was sent to the Rivesaltes internment camp, where he remained for two weeks before being sent to Drancy, a large-scale deportation camp in the suburbs of Paris.

On November 5, 1942, Bretholz was deported on convoy 42 with 1000 others headed for Auschwitz. With his friend Manfred Silberwasser he escaped through the window and leaped off the train. Staying with two priests on subsequent nights, he and Manfred were given train tickets to Paris with a new set of false identification papers, this time under the name Marcel Dumont. Upon crossing into the Southern region (Vichy France), he was arrested again for abandoning his assigned residence. He spent nine months in prison, one month of which was in solitary confinement for having escaped for two days. He was released in September 1943, and was then sent to Septfonds labor camp for one month.

In October 1943, Leo Bretholz was taken with thirteen other men to the Toulouse train station en route to the Atlantic coast to build fortifications. At this layover, he spent hours to bend the bars, then climbed out of the train window and escaped into the city of Toulouse. In Toulouse his friend Manfred sent a third set of false papers, this time under the name Max Henri Lefevre. Bretholz joined the Jewish Resistance Group Compagnons De France, known as "La Sixieme", so he could travel freely throughout France. He was assigned to Limoges, a city in south-central France. On May 8, 1944, his hernia ruptured and he collapsed on a Limoges park bench and was sent by a passerby to a hospital, where he had surgery. After spending seventeen days in the hospital, he returned for his dressings to be changed. Finally, Bretholz rejoined the underground movement, and remained in Limoges until departing on a ship for New York on January 19, 1947.

Together with his aunt and uncle he moved to Baltimore, Maryland on January 29 and immediately sought work as a handyman, working in textiles, and traveling around the Mid-Atlantic. He moved into his own apartment with his friend Freddie, and met his wife Florine (née Cohen) in November 1951; they married in July 1952. Bretholz had his first child, Myron, in 1955 and later had two daughters, named Denise and Edie. He received death notifications of his two sisters and mother in 1962, who had been deported to Auschwitz in April 1942, after which he had not heard from them. It was at this point he began to speak publicly about his experiences during the war.

In 1968 he went into the retail book business. He lived in the Netherlands with his family for two years, and co-wrote an autobiography, Leap into Darkness, with Michael Olesker. Leo Bretholz appeared in the documentary films, Survivors Among Us, and See You Again Soon.

Until his death in 2014, he lived in Pikesville, Maryland, and was a regular speaker at a range of venues, including the annual Holocaust Remembrance Project, and a number of schools.

== Fight for SNCF Reparations ==
Prior to his death, Leo Bretholz fought for reparations from SNCF, the French rail company that transported Jews to Nazi concentration and death camps. When the class action lawsuit refused to be heard by the Supreme Court, the lower court ruling that the case was outside US jurisdiction stood and the case died. When his home state of Maryland proposed a high speed rail line, he testified in the state legislature against permitting SNCF to bid on the project.

== Bibliography ==
- Bretholz, Leo; Olesker, Michael (1998). Leap into Darkness: Seven Years on the Run in Wartime Europe. Baltimore, Md.: Woodholme House Publishers. ISBN 0385497059.
