= Tova Friedman =

Holocaust Auschwitz survivor (born 1938)

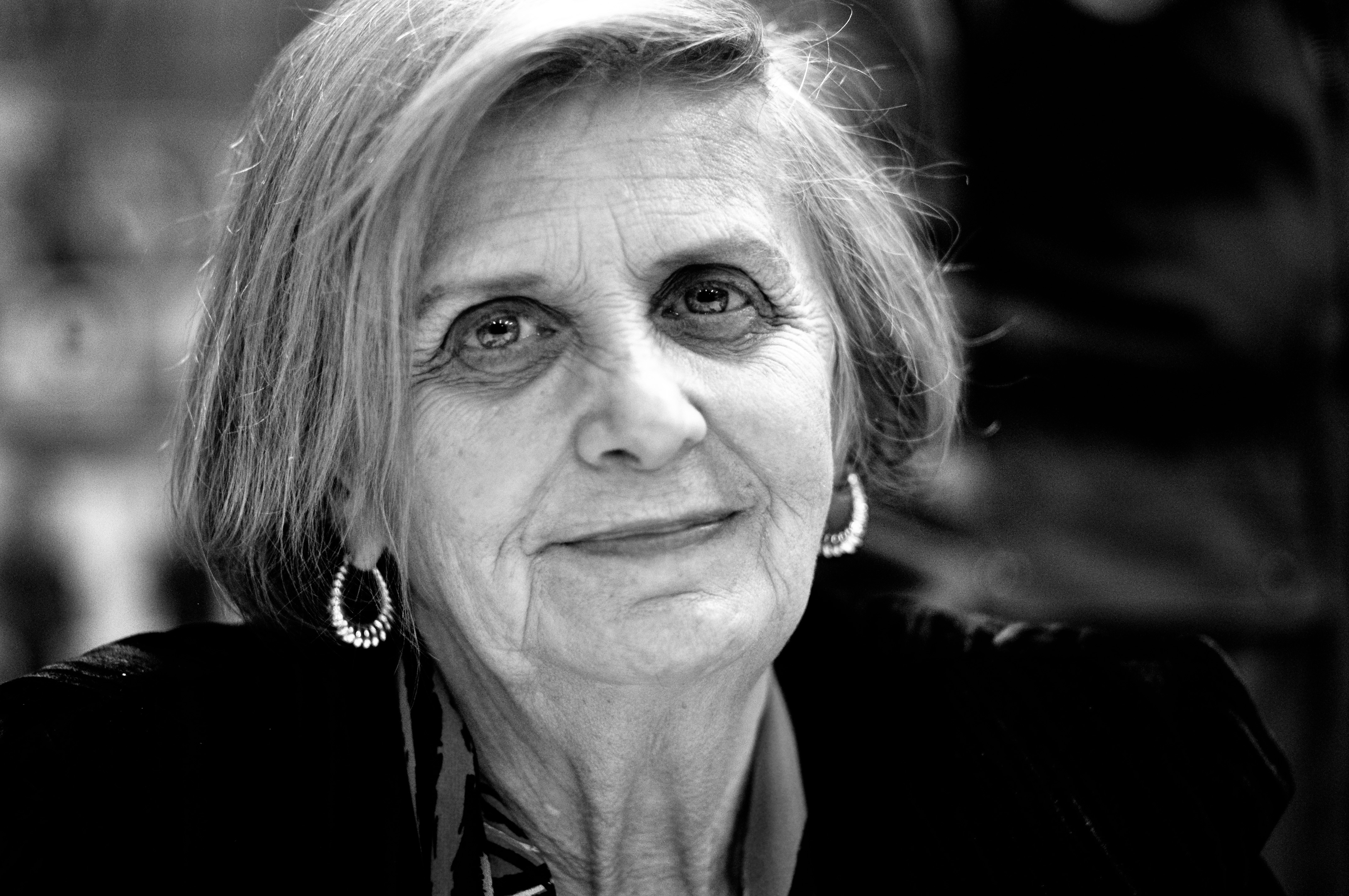
- Friedman in 2010
- Born: Tola Grossman; September 7, 1938 (age 88); Gdynia, Poland
- Citizenship: Poland; United States; Israel

Academic background
- Education: Brooklyn College; City College of New York; Rutgers University

Academic work
- Institutions: Hebrew University of Jerusalem

Tova Friedman (née Tola Grossman; born September 7, 1938) is a Jewish American therapist, social worker, author, and academic born in Poland. She is a Holocaust survivor who was sent to the Auschwitz concentration camp. Friedman taught at the Hebrew University of Jerusalem and later served as the director of the Jewish Family Service of Somerset and Warren Counties.

== Early life ==
Friedman was born on September 7, 1938, in Gdynia, Poland, close to Gdańsk. Friedman's family had moved from Tomaszow Mazowiecki, Poland, and returned there as soon as WWII broke out. Five thousand Jews were forced to live in a ghetto formed of six four-story buildings in terrible conditions. The population of the ghetto decreased over time due to starvation, shootings, and deportations. Her family was later transferred to Starachowice, where her parents worked in an ammunition factory. When children began being deported from the area, Friedman's father made her hide in a crawlspace above their home's ceiling. Despite this, by the time she was five, her father had been deported to the Dachau concentration camp and she and her mother to the Auschwitz-Birkenau extermination camp.

Having arrived on a Sunday in June 1944, Friedman was not killed on arrival, but she was shaved and tattooed with a number. She was kept contained in the Kinderlager or "children's camp" and would go on to survive starvation and a trip to the gas extermination chamber on October 7, the one day that the chamber's mechanisms malfunctioned due to other prisoners earlier having detonated an explosive in the chamber. She was further spared from another of the crematoria because her tattooed number was not on the lists of the Nazi officers running the chamber. When the Nazis left the camp in January 1945 and were going to force the remaining survivors to go on a death march, she and her mother hid between the corpses in the infirmary and were freed by the Red Army on January 27, 1945. Soviet soldiers took a picture of her showing her tattoo, which would later become an iconic photo of the war. She and her mother returned to Poland, where they found that their home had been destroyed and most of the rest of their extended family had been killed. Her father eventually returned from Dachau and they remained together in Poland for several years.

== Education and career ==
Friedman and her family decided to emigrate to the US in 1950. She received a Bachelors of Arts degree in psychology from Brooklyn College, a Masters of Arts in Black literature from the City College of New York, and a Masters of Arts in social work from Rutgers University. She went on to teach at the Hebrew University of Jerusalem and became Director of Jewish Family Service of Somerset and Warren Counties where she spent more than 20 years working as a therapist. During this time period, she married Maier Friedman and had four children.

The story of Friedman's life was written about in the 1998 book Kinderlager by Milton J. Nieuwsma and her grandson opened a profile for her on TikTok where she posts videos on her experience in Auschwitz and replies to questions from children. In 2022, she published the memoir The Daughter of Auschwitz: My Story of Resilience, Survival and Hope which she wrote with journalist Malcolm Brabant.

Friedman spoke on International Holocaust Remembrance Day, January 27, 2025, at Auschwitz. She has been invited to speak at the German Bundestag on the same day in 2026.

She currently resides in Morris County, New Jersey.

== Awards and honors ==
Friedman was honored by the Jewish women's organization L'Dor V'Dor on April 11, 2016. and by the Kay Family Award from the Anti-Defamation League in 2023.

== Bibliography ==
- —; Nieuwsma, Milton J. (2019). Surviving Auschwitz: Children of the Shoah 75th Anniversary Commemorative Edition. Apple Books. ISBN 9781596878563.
- —; Brabant, Malcolm (2022). The Daughter of Auschwitz: My Story of Resilience, Survival and Hope. Hanover Square Press. ISBN 9780369732989.
