= Dembski =

Dembski (feminine: Dembska; plural: Dembscy) is a Polish-language surname. It is a variant of Dębski ([ˈdɛmpski]). The surname may refer to:

- Paweł Dembski, 16th-century Polish churchman
- William A. Dembski (born 1960), American mathematician, philosopher and theologian
- Yevheniya Dembska (1920–2019), theatre and cinema actress

== See also ==
- Dębski
- Demski
