= Ivana Hirschmann =

Croatian professor of gymnastics

- Born: 5 May 1866; Donja Zelina, Kingdom of Croatia-Slavonia, Austria-Hungary
- Died: c. 8 May 1943 (aged 77); Auschwitz-Birkenau, German-occupied Poland
- Cause of death: Murdered in Holocaust
- Occupation: Gymnastics professor

Ivana Hirschmann (5 May 1866 – 8 May 1943) was a Croatian gymnastics professor and the first female physical education teacher in Croatia.

== Background and education ==
Hirschmann was born on May 5, 1866, in Donja Zelina to a Croatian Jewish merchant family. From 1873 to 1885, Hirschmann was educated in Zagreb. She finished four grades of public school, four grades of higher girls' school and three grades at monastery preparatory school. Her mentor was Franjo Hochmann, gymnastics professor. On October 18, 1885, with 19 years of age, she received her teacher's certificate. At the time she was known for her short haircut which she wore because of exercise, sports and sweating. In 1888, Hirschmann passed the exam for teaching at the higher elementary schools, and in 1894 the exam for teaching at the higher girls schools. On February 25, 1896, she also finished the course for teachers in Zagreb, and passed the exam for gymnastics teacher at high schools and so finished her education.

== Career ==
Hirschmann worked all her career in Zagreb. She worked at the girls lyceum from 1892 to 1920. Among others, Hirschmann also worked at the Royal vocational school, Higher girls school, Terrestrial higher girls school, Royal teachers school and Girls gymnasium. She was a vocal supporter of the necessity of physical exercise and sport among the women. Hirschmann wrote, translated and published articles in the magazines such as "Gymnastics", "Hawk" and "Domesticity". In 1885, Hirschmann began introducing to her students the sports games of cricket and croquet, as in classes, and as in the articles she wrote. Some of here published articles are; "The girls gymnastics" in 1887, "The air in the school room" in 1898, "School medical audits" in 1898, "What promotes physical education in general, and especially with the girls" in 1898, "How to safeguard children from the bent backbone" in 1898, "Dental care" in 1898, "The nervousness of the students" in 1898, "Pulmonary gymnastics" in 1912 and "The need for gymnastics and games in wartime" in 1918. In 1906, Hirschmann edited and published the booklet about the history of gymnastics in Croatia. Second edition of the booklet, revised and expanded, was published in 1913. Hirschmann also wrote about Sinjska alka. In 1923 Hirschmann retired. During her retirement she read a lot, visited the theaters and symphony concerts.

== Arrest, deportation and death ==
During World War II, as a Jew, Hirschmann was arrested by Ustaše on May 5, 1943. She was taken to the prison at Savska cesta. From there, Hirschmann was deported to Auschwitz where she was killed in the gas chambers upon arrival on May 8, 1943.

== Bibliography ==
- Snješka Knežević, Aleksander Laslo (2011). Židovski Zagreb. Zagreb: AGM, Židovska općina Zagreb. ISBN 978-953-174-393-8.
