= Mala Zimetbaum =

Belgian Jewish Resistance member (1918–1944)

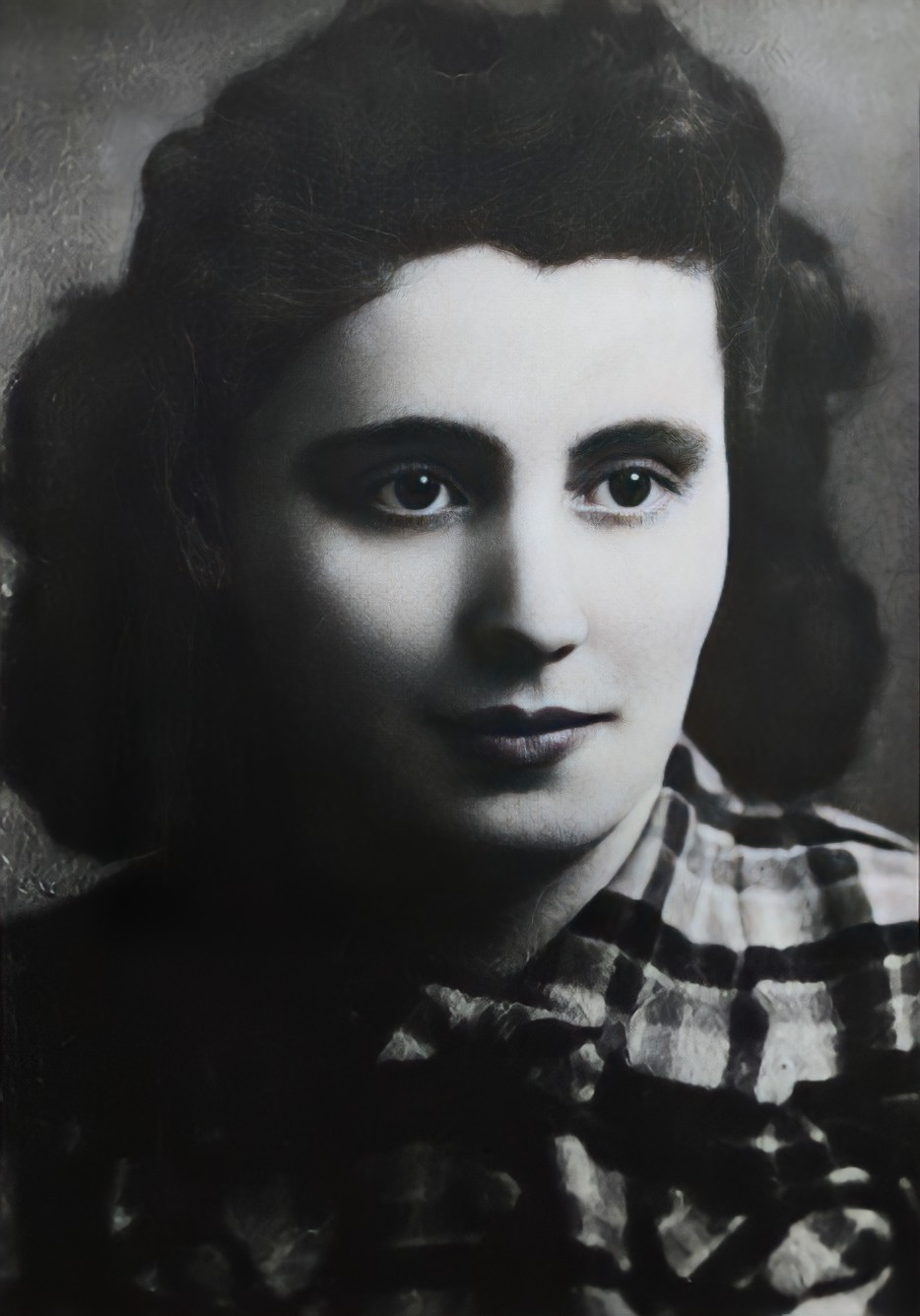
Mala Zimetbaum

Malka "Mala" Zimetbaum, also known as "Mala the Belgian" (26 January 1918 – 15 September 1944), was a Belgian woman of Polish Jewish descent, known for her escape from the Auschwitz-Birkenau concentration camp. She is also remembered for her lifesaving acts in favor of other prisoners during her captivity at Auschwitz and for the resistance she displayed at her execution following her being recaptured, when she tried committing suicide before the guards were able to execute her, then slapped the guard who tried to stop her, before eventually being killed. She was the first woman to escape from Auschwitz.

== Early life and deportation ==
Mala Zimetbaum was born in Brzesko, Poland in 1918, the youngest of five children to Pinhas and Chaya Zimetbaum. At age ten in 1928, she moved with her family to Antwerp, Belgium. In school as a child, she excelled in mathematics and was fluent in several languages. She left school to work in a diamond factory after her father became blind.

At age 24, she was either captured by Germans on July 22, 1942 or arrested during the third Antwerp raid of 11–12 September 1942. She was first sent to the Dossin Barracks sammellager in the Mechelen transit camp. Then on 15 September 1942 she was put aboard (Belgian) Transport 10 bound for the Auschwitz concentration camp, where she arrived two days later. After the initial Selektion she was sent on to the women's camp at Birkenau.

== Camp life ==
Zimetbaum spent nearly two years in Auschwitz-Birkenau as camp inmate number 19880. Due to her proficiency in languages – Dutch, French, German, Italian, English, and Polish – she was assigned work as an interpreter and courier. Other sources state that she was also fluent in Yiddish. In his book The Drowned and the Saved, Auschwitz survivor Primo Levi said, "In Birkenau she acted as an interpreter and messenger and as such enjoyed a certain freedom of movement."

Although she had a relatively privileged position, Zimetbaum played an active part in the camp's underground and devoted herself to helping other inmates. Levi said that Zimetbaum "was generous and courageous; she had helped many of her companions and was loved by all of them." She interceded to have inmates sent to easier work when she suspected they were not fit for harder labor. She also warned prisoners of coming selections in the infirmary, encouraging them to leave to save their lives. She sneaked photographs that inmates' relatives had sent, out of the files and to the inmates as they were not allowed to have them in the camp. Zimetbaum also got food and medicine for people in need.

Zimetbaum had a non-Jewish Polish lover at Auschwitz, Edward "Edek" Galiński. He was born on October 5, 1923. He was one of the first inmates at Auschwitz, having been sent there in June 1940 from Tarnów prison as a political prisoner. At Auschwitz he received the very low camp inmate number 531.

== Failed escape from Auschwitz-Birkenau ==
Edward "Edek" Galiński

Galiński initially planned to escape from the camp with his friend Wieslaw Kielar, an Auschwitz survivor and author of the autobiographical book Anus Mundi: 5 Years in Auschwitz. Galinski had worked as a mechanic before being imprisoned, a job which brought him in contact with civilians working around the camp and with the women's prison where he met Zimetbaum. The plan fell through when Kielar lost a pair of SS guard's uniform pants needed as a disguise for their escape. Galiński told his friend that he would escape with Zimetbaum instead and would later find a way to send the uniform back to Kielar for his subsequent escape.

Levi said, "In the summer of 1944 [Zimetbaum] decided to escape with Edek, a Polish political prisoner. She not only wanted to reconquer her own freedom; she was also planning to document the daily massacre at Birkenau." Zimetbaum wanted to escape so that she could inform the Allies of what was going on at Auschwitz and thus save lives. She is said by some sources to have been the head of a resistance group. The escape was planned for Saturday June 24, 1944, when guard would be lighter due to the weekend. On the planned date, the couple succeeded in escaping to a nearby town. Galiński donned an SS uniform obtained from Edward Lubusch; Zimetbaum obtained a blank SS pass and dressed as a prisoner being led to work. They were caught after two weeks, on July 6, 1944, in the Żywiec Beskids mountains at the Slovakia border. Galiński had hidden nearby as Zimetbaum went into a store to try to buy some bread with gold that she and Galiński had stolen from the camp. A passing German border patrol became suspicious and arrested Zimetbaum. Galiński, watching from a distance as Zimetbaum was arrested, turned himself in to the German patrol since they had promised not to separate.

Zimetbaum and Galiński were taken to Block 11 in the main camp at Auschwitz, a punishment barracks known as "the Bunker", where they were placed in separate cells. Galiński was eventually put in a group cell with another man. Galiński scratched his and Zimetbaum's names and camp numbers into the cell wall. A friendly guard passed notes to them through a hole in the wall between the cell they were in and an empty one. Sometimes Galiński and Zimetbaum would whistle to each other down the hall. When outside for exercise, Galiński would stand near the window he thought was Zimetbaum's cell window and sing an Italian aria.

== Execution ==
Galiński and Zimetbaum were transferred to Birkenau on September 15, 1944. They were taken out to be hanged in a public execution at the same time, in the men's and women's camps respectively.

Galiński jumped into the noose before the verdict was read, but the guards put him back on the platform. Galiński then shouted something to the effect of "Long Live Poland!" One person told all the other prisoners to take their hats off as a respect to Galiński and they all did.

Meanwhile, Levi and Auschwitz survivor Raya Kagan both reported that Zimetbaum had gotten hold of a razor blade and, at the foot of the gallows, cut the artery on one of her wrists. Accounts vary as to what happened next. Some people reported she said they would soon be liberated. Still others stated that she shouted at the assembled prisoners to revolt, that it was worth risking their life and if they died trying it was better than the situation they were in now in the camp. Levi said an SS guard tried to snatch the razor blade from her. Levi and Kagan both witnessed Zimetbaum slap the guard's face with her bloody hand. Kagan reported that Zimetbaum shouted at the guard, "I shall die a heroine, but you shall die like a dog!" Levi said, "Enraged, other guards immediately came running: a prisoner, a Jewess, a woman, had dared defy them!" Others reported that the SS guard grabbed her arm and broke it. Then the camp staff jumped on her, knocking her to the ground, and taped her mouth shut.

An SS officer named Maria Mandl said that an order from Berlin had come to burn Zimetbaum alive in the crematorium. They put her on a wheelbarrow and selected several prisoners from the front of the group of onlookers to take her to the nearby camp infirmary. Zimetbaum said weakly to the assembled prisoners, "The day of reckoning is near". On the way to the crematorium, Zimetbaum told the women pulling the handcart she was on that she knew she could have survived, but she chose not to because she wanted to follow what she believed in.

Accounts of her death differ, as Zimetbaum was taken to the camp hospital in order to stop the bleeding. Levi and other witnesses said that she died while on the handcart. Others reported that a guard took pity on her and shot her at the crematorium entrance. Still others observed she had poison on her and took it before she could be burned alive. The prisoners forced to cremate the corpses had been informed that Zimetbaum was arriving, and they made special preparations. They prayed and cried as they burned her remains. The prisoners who had pulled the handcart then went back to the barracks and told other prisoners what they had witnessed.

Despite the differences between versions of what transpired at the public executions, all firsthand testimonies and autobiographies were united in their description of Zimetbaum as a courageous Jewish woman that remained unbowed by camp life and aided other prisoners.

== Testimonial account ==
The first recorded accounts of Mala Zimetbaum's story can be found in two audio interviews collected by Latvian-American psychologist David Boder, who recorded over a hundred Holocaust survivor testimonies as early as 1946. On August 7, 1946, Boder interviewed survivors Edith Serras and Henja Frydman in a Displaced Persons Camp in Paris, and both of them independently told Boder about the actions of the woman they only knew as Mala from Belgium. Frydman credited Zimetbaum with saving her life by erasing her tattoo number from an execution list, and Serras remembered Zimetbaum for saving numerous other women by erasing their numbers from condemned lists and arranging for extra food for them.

Information regarding Zimetbaum was later made available to the broader public in Kagan's official testimony, delivered on 8 June 1961 during Session 70 in the trial of Adolf Eichmann in Jerusalem.

After World War II, little is known of the surviving members of the Zimetbaum Hartman family. Zimetbaum's siblings, Gitla, Marjem, and Salomon Rubin, survived the Nazi Holocaust. It is also known that Gitla migrated to and died in Guayaquil, Ecuador, and that her direct descendants are all aware of Zimetbaum's legacy.

=== Mala, The Music of the Wind ===
In January 2002, a musical based on the life of Zimetbaum, titled Mala, The Music of the Wind, opened at the Pallas Theatre in Athens, Greece, starring Greek pop singer Anna Vissi. It was written by Nikos Karvelas. A single and the complete 27-song soundtrack were later released on CD.

=== The Last Stage ===
The Last Stage is a 1948 feature film set in the Auschwitz concentration camp, directed and co-written by Wanda Jakubowska. The main character, Marta Weiss, is based on the true story of Mala Zimetbaum. Seventy two years after it was first shown in Poland, it was screened as part of the Israeli Polish Zoom events, a project of the Polish Institute in Tel Aviv and the Adam Mickiewicz Institute in Poland. A 2019 review of the film was published in the Haaretz newspaper.

== Sources ==
- "Captured SS deportation files for Belgium as well as numerous photographs and personal records". Jewish Museum of Deportation and Resistance, Documentation Centre. Mechelen, Belgium.
- Der 1. Frankfurter Auschwitz-Prozess. Berlin: Digitale Bibliothek (Bibliothekskatalog). 2004.
- Gutman, Israel (1990). "Mala Zimetbaum". Encyclopedia of the Holocaust (in Hebrew). Vol. 4. New York: Macmillan. p. 1037.
- Huber, Gérard (2006). "Préface de Simone Veil". Book Review: Mala. Une Femme Juive Héroique dans le Camp d'Auschwitz-Birkenau (in French) (Éditions du Rocher ed.). ISBN 2-268-05863-8.
- Sichelschmidt, Lorenz (1995). Mala. Ein Leben und eine Liebe in Auschwitz (in German). Bremen. ISBN 3-924444-89-7.
- Hermann Langbein, Menschen in Auschwitz, Frankfurt/Main u. a. 1980. ISBN 3-548-33014-2.
- Jürgen Serke, Die Gesichter von Auschwitz, in: Cicero-Magazin, May 2005, S. 66 ff.
- Wiesław Kielar, Anus Mundi. Fünf Jahre Auschwitz. S. Fischer Verlag, Frankfurt am Main 1979, 14. ed.: 2013, ISBN 978-3-596-23469-1, pp. 319–342
- Francesca Paci: Un amore ad Auschwitz, Utet, Novara 2016, ISBN 978-88-511-3690-1.
- Barbara Beuys: Die Heldin von Auschwitz. Leben und Widerstand der Mala Zimetbaum. Insel, Berlin 2023, ISBN 978-3-458-64386-9.
