= Demsky =

Demsky (Demski, Demska) is a Polish-language surname, may refer to:

- Aaron Demsky, professor of biblical history
- Izzy Demsky, a name used by American actor Kirk Douglas (1916–2020)
- Danielle Demski, an Arizona beauty pageant winner who has competed in the Miss Teen USA and Miss USA pageants
- Joel S. Demski (born 1940), American accounting researcher and educator
- Nic Demski (born 1993), Canadian football slotback
- Pavlin Demski (died 1656), Catholic missionary

== See also ==
- Dębski
- Dembski
- Demsky City District, a city district of Ufa in the Republic of Bashkortostan, Russia
