= Fritz Duschinsky =

Friedrich "Fritz" Duschinsky (26 February 1907 – 1 December 1942) was a German-Czech physicist. He worked on photochemistry in France, Germany, Belgium and the Soviet Union. He was deported from France (Bagneaux-sur-Loing) and murdered in the Auschwitz concentration camp in 1942. He made important contributions to the theory of molecular vibronic spectra (transition between vibrational levels of different electronic states). The Duschinsky rotation effect and the Duschinsky transformation in chemistry and chemical physics are named after him.

== Life ==
He was born in Jablonec nad Nisou in Austria-Hungary (now in the Czech Republic) to a Jewish family. He studied experimental physics at the German University in Prague before moving to the universities of Paris (where he interned under Marie Curie) and Berlin.

In Berlin, he worked under Peter Pringsheim, a German-Jewish professor of physics, with a focus on sodium resonance radiation. He also worked occasionally with Walther Nernst there. After obtaining his doctorate in 1932, Duschinsky started an assistantship with Karl Weissenberg at the Kaiser Wilhelm Institute for Physics.

In April 1933, after Jewish scientists were banned from their profession in Germany, he moved to Brussels, following Pringsheim (whose wife was Belgian). They were welcomed by Auguste Piccard and worked in his physics laboratory. He received a fellowship paid from Pringsheim's own fund, which ran out in 1935. Attempts since 1933 to obtain a position in the U.S., New Zealand and Ecuador through the Academic Assistance Council were unsuccessful.

Receiving an invitation from the State Optical Institute, Duschinsky moved to Leningrad (St. Petersburg) in 1936 as a research associate. He worked on the experiment and theory of optics and spectroscopy. He published in 1937 a paper describing the effects of different normal mode coordinates between excited and ground electronic surfaces on molecular vibronic spectra. He also proposed a linear transformation that relates the normal mode coordinates of two electronic states (through vibrational mode mixing). This paper, published in German in the Acta Physicochimica U.R.S.S., has been cited more than 1000 times.

The extension of his stay in the Soviet Union was made conditional on his acceptance of Soviet citizenship and consequent relinquishment of his Czechoslovak citizenship, a condition he rejected. He then left the Soviet Union in October 1937 and started working as a technical adviser for an optical production firm in Jablonec nad Nisou.

At some point after 1937, likely after the annexation of Sudetenland, he fled to Bagneaux-sur-Loing in France, where he was arrested under order of SiPo-Sd during the roundup in Seine-et-Marne on 21 October 1942 with the name recorded as "Bedrich Buchinsky". He was then deported on 11 November to Auschwitz, and killed there on 1 December of the same year.

Along with Fritz Epstein, he was one of two Jewish scientists expelled from the Kaiser Wilhelm Institutes who were later murdered in a concentration camp.

== Works ==
- F. Duschinsky, Der Einfluß von Zusammenstößen Auf Die Abklingzeit Der Na-Resonanzstrahlung, Zeitschrift Für Physik 78, 586 (1932).
- F. Duschinsky, Der Zeitliche Intensitätsverlauf von Intermittierend Angeregter Resonanzstrahlung, Zeitschrift Für Physik 81, 7 (1933).
- F. Duschinsky, Eine Allgemeine Theorie Der Zur Messung Sehr Kurzer Leuchtdauern Dienenden Versuchsanordnungen (Fluorometer), Zeitschrift Für Physik 81, 23 (1933).
- F. Duschinsky, E. Hirschlaff, and P. Pringsheim, Ultraviolette Fluoreszenzspektra Des Joddampfes, Resonanzspektra, Physica 2, 439 (1935).
- F. Duschinsky and P. Pringsheim, Ultraviolette Fluoreszenzspektra Des Joddampfes: McLennan-Banden, Physica 2, 633 (1935).
- F. Duschinsky and P. Pringsheim, Ultraviolette Fluoreszenzspektra Des Joddampfes: Einfluss von Fremdgasen, Physica 2, 923 (1935).
- F. Duschinsky, Zur Deutung der Elektronenspektren mehratomiger Moleküle [I. Über das Franck-Condon prinzip]. Acta Physicochim. URSS 7, 551 (1937)
