= Rosa Stallbaumer =

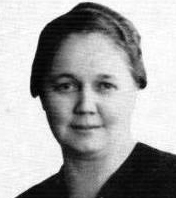
- Rosa Stallbaumer, circa 1940
- Born: Rosa Hoffman; 30 November 1897; Sillian, Austria-Hungary
- Died: 23 November 1942 (aged 44); Auschwitz-Birkenau, German-occupied Poland
- Occupations: Member of the Austrian Resistance, World War II
- Spouse: Anton Stallbaumer (1888–1962)

Rosa (Hoffman) Stallbaumer (30 November 1897 – 23 November 1942) was a member of the Austrian Resistance during World War II. Her name is one of 124 names of women and men from Tyrol, Austria inscribed on the Liberation Monument at The Eduard-Wallnöfer-Platz in Innsbruck in recognition of both her involvement in resisting National Socialism and of her death at Auschwitz, following her incarceration at that Nazi concentration camp as punishment for helping Jewish targets of Nazi persecution escape to Italy.

== Formative years ==
Born on 30 November 1897 in Sillian-Ahrnbach, Tyrol, Austria as Rosa Hoffman, she was the wife of fellow Austrian Resistance member Anton Stallbaumer (1888–1962), who had made a living prior to the war in the truck transport of various goods.

== The Anschluss and World War II ==
Following the annexation of Austria by Nazi Germany on 12 March 1938 (also known as the Anschluss), Rosa Stallbaumer and her husband became active with the Austrian Resistance movement, hiding Jewish people who had become targets of Nazi persecution during The Holocaust before also helping them to escape from Vienna to Italy by way of Austria's East Tyrol region.

Reported to local officials by Nazi sympathizers in 1942, she and her husband became targets of the Geheime Staatspolizei, the Nazi's Secret State Police known more commonly as the Gestapo. Following the arrest of her husband and several other members of their resistance cell, Rosa Stallbaumer was also taken into custody shortly thereafter. Sentenced with four other members of their resistance unit on 26 June 1942, the Stallbaumers were sent to the Nazi concentration camp at Dachau. According to Dachau records, Anton Stallbaumer arrived at the concentration camp on 10 October 1942, was designated as a "Schutzhäftling" and was assigned inmate number "289406." Translated roughly as "protective custody prisoner," the term "Schutzhäftling" was a euphemism used by Nazis to describe political prisoners or others they deemed to be threats to the Third Reich (many of whom were detained without trial). These records also documented that Anton Stallbaumer had been a resident of Sillian, Austria at the time of his capture by the Gestapo, and was a native of Sillian who had been born in that community on 18 May 1888.

Their two daughters, aged 9 and 14, who had already endured the trauma of losing their parents, were then forcibly separated from each other as they were sent off to different Nazi re-education camps. Nazi officials then sent Rosa Stallbaumer to the Third Reich's concentration camp at Auschwitz, ensuring that she and her husband would remain separated for the duration of their imprisonment. He survived his lengthy, difficult incarceration and was ultimately released from Dachau on 14 December 1943, but she did not.

Rosa Stallbaumer was murdered at Auschwitz on 23 November 1942. Although Nazi officials notified her husband about her death, they provided no details regarding the circumstances of her death.

== Surviving family ==
The daughters of Rosa and Anton Stallbaumer were ultimately released from separate re-education camps, with the youngest placed into the care of a Slovenian farmer (according to statements later made by her older sister, Anna-Luise). They were then returned to the custody of their father, who had been permitted to return to Austria following his December 1943 release from Dachau after completing his sentence and paying fines related to that sentence.

It was only after their reunification with their father that they learned of their mother's death at Auschwitz. As part of his efforts to rebuild his family, Anton Stallbaumer reportedly remarried. Surviving his first wife, Rosa (Hoffman) Stallbaumer, by two decades, he died in Sillian, Austria, on 20 October 1962.

According to author Gisela Hormayr, author of the 2017 book, Wenn ich wenigstens von euch Abschied nehmen könnte ("If at least I could say goodbye to you"), as Luise (Stallbaumer) Reider reflected on her life, she noted that the last memories she had of her parents were of her father's arrest by the Gestapo in May 1942, and spending time with her mother two days later at a Mother's Day celebration.

== External resources ==
- 124 Opfer des Widerstandes: Kurzbiografien (124 victims of the resistance: short biographies). Der Eduard-Wallnöfer-Platz in Innsbruck, retrieved online, 6 April 2018.
- Concentration Camps. Jerusalem: Yad Vashem, retrieved online, 6 April 2018.
- Luza, Radomir. The Resistance in Austria, 1938–1945. Minneapolis: University of Minnesota Press, 1984.
- Morse, Steve and Peter Landé. Dachau Concentration Camp Records (online database).
