= Tadeusz Wiejowski =

Polish shoemaker and first person to escape Auschwitz

Tadeusz Wiejowski (died 1941) was a Polish shoemaker who was the first person to escape the Auschwitz concentration camp. In 1941 he was recaptured and committed to the Jasło prison camp, where he was executed.

== Auschwitz escape ==
Tadeusz Wiejowski was imprisoned in Auschwitz on 14 June 1940. His assigned number in the camp was 220. He escaped on 6 July 1940 with help from Polish civil workers employed in Auschwitz: Bolesław Bicz, Emil Kowalowski, Stanisław Mrzygłód, Józef Muszyński, and Józef Patek. Four of them were members of Związek Walki Zbrojnej, a Polish military organization. From the civil workers, Wiejowski received civilian clothing, food and money.

On discovery of the escape, the Nazi guards held a twenty-hour roll call, from 6 p.m. on July 6 to 2 p.m. the next day, of the 1311 prisoners who were flogged, beaten and kicked while standing for the roll call. The first death at Auschwitz occurred when prisoner Dawid Wongczewski collapsed and died from having stood for so long.

On 8 July 1940, Wiejowski's helpers were arrested and imprisoned in Auschwitz. Ten prisoners were selected to be punished; however, five of the spots were filled by Bicz, Kowalowski, Mrzygłód, Muszyński, and Patek. Unique to this case, an additional prisoner named Eugeniusz Hejka received equal punishment after a letter written by him was found on one of the civil workers. Of the five Polish civil workers, only Bicz survived the war.

Wiejowski spent a year in Kołaczyce, where he lived secretly with family, but at the end of 1941 he was again arrested and imprisoned in Jasło, where he was executed.
