= Carlo Taube =

Austrian composer

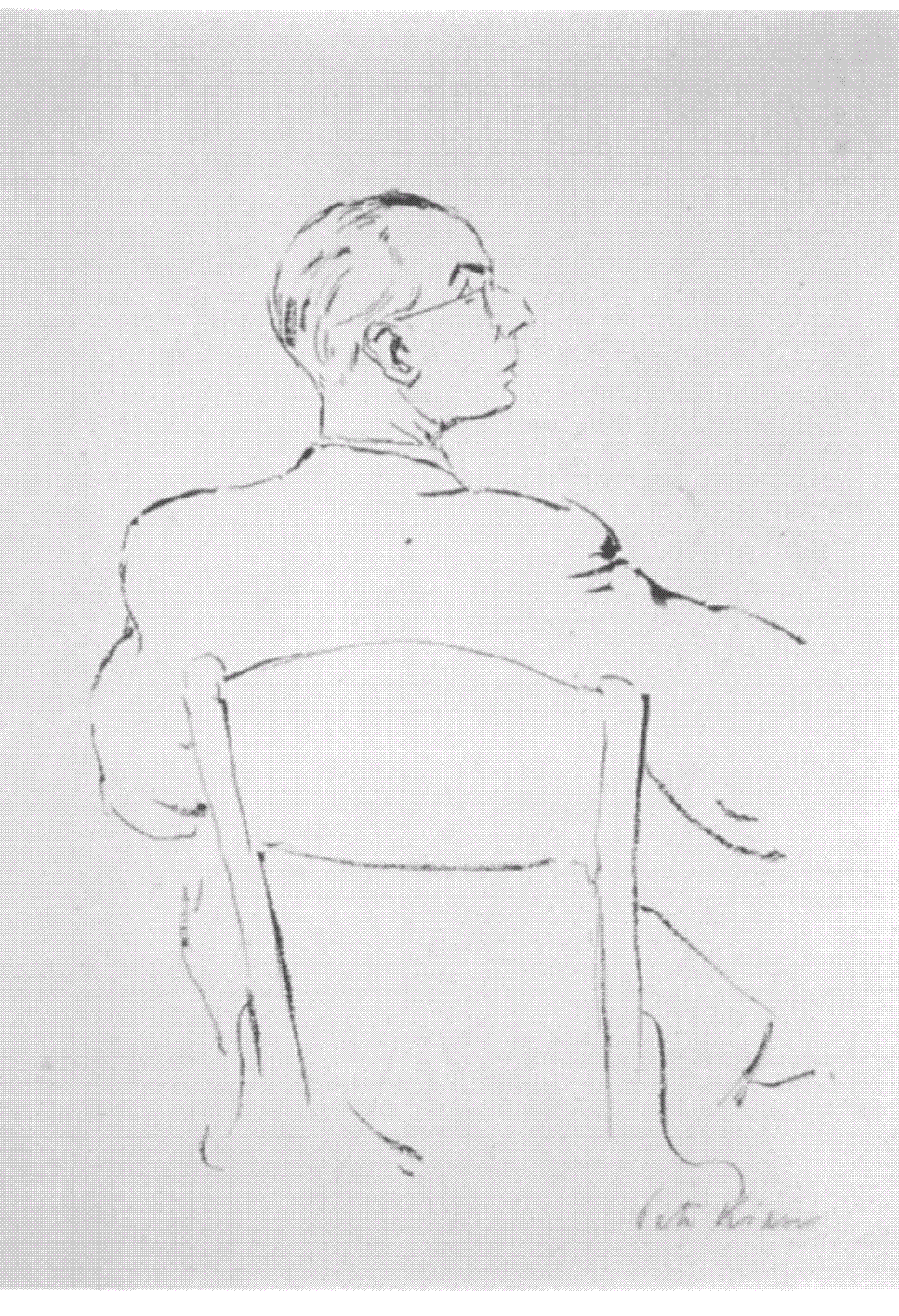
Sketch of Carlo Taube

Carlo Sigmund Taube (4 July 1897 – 3 October 1944) was a Czech Jewish pianist, composer and conductor.

== Life ==
Carlo Taube was born in the region of Galicia on 4 July 1897. He studied music in Vienna with Ferruccio Busoni and earned a living by performing in cafes in Vienna, Brno and Prague. Taube, his wife Erika and their child were deported from Prague to the Terezín (Theresienstadt Ghetto) on 10 December 1941. In April 1942 he conducted the first orchestra performance in the Terezín Magdeburg caserne, premiering his own Terezín Symphony. Taube gave a number of solo concerts and conducted the Terezín band and orchestra. He also performed in the café. Carlo and Erika Taube and their child were deported to Auschwitz-Birkenau about 1 October 1944 (arriving Auschwitz 3 October 1944), where they were murdered.

His fellow survivor and holocaust survivor from Prague František R. Kraus, who stood right behind him during the selection upon the Birkenau Ramp, gave a postwar direct testimony about Taube's last moments:

Carlo was thrown off the train with me... Quick, quick, quick! Canada is expelling us, just as we are, without a hat, without a coat, without luggage. It is raining, raining, the sky is crying over everything we can already see here on this embankment, behind the wires. We are drowning in the mud, the column of new arrivals is moving. Carlo is wading alongside me. We are approaching Mengele's tribunal at the station. An elegant SS officer, tall, handsome, stands here astride in a shiny greenish leather coat. He holds a whip in his left hand, with his right he points right, left, right, left, smiling. Around him are about fifteen other SS men, officers with whips, men with machine guns, and so many wolfdogs that one sees nothing but dogs and more dogs. Carlo walks in front of me. Mengele stops him. "Glasses? What are you?" Carlo, please don't say you play Rhapsody in Blue so beautifully! "Pianist and composer!"' "Gesund? Can you do manual work?" "Herr..." Carlo doesn't recognize the batch, he stammers. "I'm a little weaker, but..." Mengele is no longer talking to him, he points to where the endless line of wretches selected for destruction is leading. Carlo doesn't know where he's going. We didn't know either. Carlo disappears into the throng of the weaker ones, who can no longer raise Genghis Khan's war potential. Mengele sent me to the galleys. I still turn around in the throng, looking for Carlo. I can still see him from afar. The SS have taken them over. They are being driven like a slaughtered herd to the chambers. It rains and rains, the sky is crying, it is crying over the fate of Carlo, over the fate of this Terezín transport, over the fate of all humanity. It is crying. And as the water runs down my collar, I feel that I am crying too. I am crying. I can still cry. Later I forgot it. They drive us along the camp road. The rain taps on the roofs of the green huts. I hear the melody of the rain, which mixes with Rhapsody in Blue. The moment we stopped in front of the sauna, a sharp note tore through the air: a string of Carl's silverest instrument was broken. His soul snapped. I heard it all the way here. At that moment he must have died, in a cyclone, squeezed against the others, man on man, without air... just cyclone and cyclone whistling here... "Frank, I'm choking! Help!" Then it was over.

== Works ==
Taube composed several pieces in Terezín in addition to the Terezín Symphony. These include:

- a Ghetto Lullaby (part of a Ghetto Suite for Alto and Orchestra),
- Poem, Caprice and Meditation, three short pieces for solo violin,
- Ein Jüdisches Kind (A Jewish Child), a lullaby for soprano and piano (the only work by Taube to survive World War II) – recorded by Anne Sofie von Otter

== Sources ==
- Makarova, Elena, S. Makarov, V. Kuperman. University Over the Abyss. 2nd ed. Verba Publishers, Jerusalem, 2004.
- Karas, Joža. Music in Terezín, 1941-1945. 1st Ed. Beaufort Books Publishers, New York, 1985.
- Kuna, Milan. Hudba na hranici života (Engl: Music on the Boundary of Life). 1st ed. Naše vojsko/Český svaz protifašistických bojovníků, Prague, 1990.
