= Eugeniusz Hejka =

Eugeniusz Hejka (16 October 1918 – 2009) was a Polish soldier who was captured by the Germans and made a prisoner in the first mass transport to Auschwitz concentration camp on 14 June 1940. Hejka was allocated number 608 upon arrival at Auschwitz.

On 6 July 1940, Tadeusz Wiejowski (no. 220) escaped from Auschwitz with the help of five Polish civil workers who were employed as electricians at the time.

On discovery of the escape, the Nazi guards held a twenty-hour roll call, from 6PM on July 6 to 2PM the next day, of 1311 prisoners who were flogged beaten and kicked while standing for the roll call. During the ensuing investigation by the Nazis, it was found that Hejka had written a letter to his parents on behalf of him and his brothers, no. 109 and 354, and given the letter to one of the Polish civil workers. Five other prisoners were then selected from the roll call to be punished alongside the five civil workers. Due to the letter, Hejka was selected as an eleventh to be punished for Wiejowski's escape. This was unique, as in most cases only ten people were punished for the escape of a prisoner.

After spending time in the death block the eleven were sentenced to be hanged. The sentence was cancelled minutes prior to their execution and prisoner 608 and the other five prisoners were moved from Auschwitz to Flossenbürg concentration camp. The Polish civil workers remained at Auschwitz, and only one of them survived.

Hejka spent a total of five years in Nazi prison camps.

Hejka and his brothers survived the war. Shortly after, Hejka moved to Australia where he helped establish the Polish community in Adelaide, SA. This included being founder and chairman of the Dom Polski centre. He lived in Adelaide with his wife and family until his death in 2009.
