= Stefania Budniak =

Polish Auschwitz survivor

- Born: Stefania Stawowy; 12 July 1912; Grodziec (Będzin)
- Died: 16 July 1982 (aged 70)
- Known for: Prisoner 72307 at Auschwitz
- Criminal charges: Conspiracy and Resistance
- Criminal penalty: Sentenced to Auschwitz prison camp
- Spouse: Florian Budniak
- Children: Ewa Budniak; Barbara Budniak; Katarzyna Budniak-Wojtas
- Father: Ludwik Stawowy

Stefania Budniak (12 July 1912-16 July 1982) was a member of the Polish resistance who was voluntarily sent to Auschwitz in her husband's place during the Second World War. Budniak was liberated from Zwodau concentration camp by American soldiers on 7 May 1945.

== Early life ==
Budniak was born on 12 July 1912 Grodziec (Będzin). She attended Sisters of Ursulanek Gymnasium in Tarnów for her education. Budniak studied world literature, poetry, and French. She also learned practical skills relating to being a homemaker while in school.

== Resistance and arrest ==
Budniak's husband, Florian (Note: pseudonym Andrzej), was a ZWZ activist during the German and Soviet occupation of Poland during the Second World War. Budniak assisted her husband with the resistance beginning in 1940. He led the Radomsko partisan group nicknamed "Grunwald." She became a point of contact, and their home became a place of accommodation for other resistance members of the area. She also conducted radio intercepts and participated in printing the Czyn Zbrojny (in English: Armed Action), an underground pamphlet for the resistance. Budniak was arrested on 28 October 1943 at the foresters lodge in Kobielach village. She hid Florian in a hidden compartment within the home, causing her to be arrested in his place. Budniak was imprisoned while being investigated in Częstochowa.

== Imprisonment ==
Budniak arrived at Auschwitz on 19 December 1943 and was imprisoned under prisoner number 72307. She wore a red felt triangle badge, identifying Budniak as a political prisoner. While imprisoned, Budniak helped to construct roads, worked in the fields, and worked in the camp sewing room. During her time in the camps, she kept and hid a few mementos, including a photo of her two daughters at the time, a religious medal of the Virgin Mary and Jesus, two plastic figurines of a mouse and an elephant, and a ring. In August 1944, she was one of 61 women and 310 men that were transferred to KL Ravensbrück. Two weeks later, Budniak was moved to Helmbrechts concentration camp, where she was assigned prisoner number 55131. As the end of the war approached, Helmbrechts camp was evacuated on 13 April 1945. Budniak and the other female prisoners were marched to Zwodau, where all the non-Jewish prisoners would remain while all of the Jewish and German women would continue marching to Neustadt. Budniak documented the march with pencil on a piece of paper, which was saved and now resides in the Auschwitz museum. The march of women arrived in Zwodau on 17 April 1945. Zwodau concentration camp was liberated by American soldiers on 7 May 1945.

== Death and legacy ==
Budniak died on 16 July 1982 (aged 70) and was laid to rest at the Marysin Cemetery in Warsaw, Poland. In 2010, Budniak's family donated the prisoner's dress, the prisoner number from Helmbrecht, the red felt triangle, the photo of Ewa and Barbara, and the handwritten note documenting the march to Zwodau to the Auschwitz-Birkenau State Museum. The Budniak family maintained possession of the two small plastic figurines and the plastic ring with the camp number, stating that the last items may be donated at a later date.
