= Jakub Dębski =

Polish cartoonist

- Born: Jakub Dębski; 10 June 1988 (age 38); Warsaw, Poland
- Occupations: YouTuber; illustrator; cartoonist; animator

YouTube information
- Channel: Dem3000
- Years active: 2010–present
- Subscribers: 533 thousand
- Views: 148 millions
- Last updated: 6 February 2025
- Website: www.demland.pl

Jakub Dębski (Polish: [ˈjakup ˈdɛmp.ski]; born 10 June 1988), known online as Dem or Dem3000, is a cartoonist, writer, and YouTuber most known as the creator of the Kuce z Bronksu animated web series. His most prominent comic books include Duże ilości naraz psów (2007), Raptory (2018), Magowie (2020), and Czyjś Syn (2024).

== Career ==
=== Comics ===
Jakub Dębski started his career publishing webcomics on his website in 2004. He first gained popularity with Duże ilości naraz psów in 2007 and self-published his first printed comic book Brak zrozumienia dla realizmu in 2010.

His style consists of basic stick figures on simple white or gray backgrounds. He has been called a minimalist cartoonist with his works exhibited next to other Polish minimalist comic book artists.

His semi-autobiographical work Czyjś Syn has been named The Best Independent Comic of 2024 at the Złote Kurczaki award show.

He is a co-founder of NetKolektyw, a group of webcomic artists from Poland.

=== YouTube ===
In 2011 he published his first video on his YouTube channel, an advertisement for his webcomic merchandise. Over the years he expanded the scope of his channel. As of February 2025 it includes a variety of formats - comedy sketches, animated shorts, genuine and satirical vlogs, film reviews, top 10 lists and video essays. His most famous works include an animated series lampooning My Little Pony: Friendship Is Magic called Kuce z Bronksu and Star Trek Przerobiony, a show created by cutting clips from Star Trek: The Animated Series and replacing the soundtrack with new voices.

During the 2020–2021 women's strike protests in Poland some characters and phrases from the Kuce z Bronksu series were featured on numerous protest signs. Dębski reacted by fully supporting the protests, creating new banner designs, and a special episode of the series.

== Private life ==
Dębski spent first two years of his life in Zalesie Górne in Masovian Voivodeship, and later grew up in Mrągowo, Warmian–Masurian Voivodeship. As an adult he settled in Kraków.

== Comics and graphic novels ==
- 2007: Kolektyw #1 (writer; collaborative work; NetKolektyw; ISSN 2080-5918)
- 2007: Kolektyw #2 (writer; collaborative work; NetKolektyw; ISSN 2080-5918)
- 2010: Brak zrozumienia dla realizmu (writer and illustrator; Demland; ISBN 978-83-927803-2-8)
- 2011: Niepojmowanie mangi (writer and illustrator; Demland; ISBN 978-83-927803-6-6)
- 2012: Kolektyw #10 (writer, collaborative work; Dolna Półka; ISBN 978-83-937057-1-9)
- 2013: Mój mały jogurt (writer and illustrator; Demland; ISBN 978-83-937057-1-9)
- 2013: Komiks za darmo (writer and illustrator; Demland)
- 2013: Kundle (writer and illustrator; Demland; ISBN 978-83-937057-0-2)
- 2013: Ogarnij mieszkanie (writer and illustrator; Demland; ISBN 978-83-937057-3-3)
- 2013: Orzeł (oraz inne dzieła myśli demokratycznej) (writer and illustrator; Demland; ISBN 978-83-937057-2-6)
- 2013: (W pełni zgodny z prawdą) Atlas zwierząt (writer and illustrator; Demland; ISBN 978-83-937057-2-6)
- 2014: Chałwa (writer and illustrator; Demland; ISBN 978-83-937057-9-5)
- 2014: Czyjś tata (kolekcja 2007–2013) (writer and illustrator; Demland; ISBN 978-83-937057-5-7)
- 2014: Peryferie Kosmosu (writer and illustrator; Demland; ISBN 978-83-937057-6-4)
- 2014: Rycerz Agata (writer and illustrator; Demland; ISBN 978-83-937057-7-1)
- 2015: Omacnica (writer and illustrator; Demland; ISBN 978-83-937057-9-5)
- 2015: Blog, Marka, Rodzina (writer and illustrator; Demland; ISBN 978-83-941693-1-2)
- 2015: Spacerniak (writer and illustrator; Demland; ISBN 978-83-941693-2-9)
- 2016: Cuda Bianki (writer and illustrator; Demland; ISBN 978-83-941693-3-6)
- 2016: Jeden pies (writer and illustrator; Demland; ISBN 978-83-941693-5-0)
- 2016: Ostatni serwer (writer and illustrator; Demland; ISBN 978-83-941693-4-3)
- 2016: Pa, pa, ptaszki (writer and illustrator; Demland; ISBN 978-83-941693-6-7)
- 2016: Warchlaki 2 (writer; collaborative work)
- 2017: Jeże (writer and illustrator; Demland; ISBN 978-83-948880-0-8)
- 2017: Prezydent (writer and illustrator; Demland; ISBN 978-83-941693-7-4
- 2017: Tyci biznesmen daje sobie radę, ISBN 978-83-941693-8-1)
- 2017: Warchlaki 3 (writer; collaborative work)
- 2018: Farsy (writer and illustrator; Demland; ISBN 978-83-948880-1-5)
- 2018: Spacja, Foka ze snu (writer and illustrator; Demland; ISBN 978-83-941693-9-8)
- 2018: Duże ilości naraz psów (writer and illustrator; Demland; ISBN 978-83-948880-2-2)
- 2018: Ekskluzywne Mydło (writer and illustrator; collaborative work; Mydło Zin; ISBN 978-83-945589-9-4)
- 2018: Raptory (writer and illustrator; Demland; ISBN 978-83-948880-3-9)
- 2018: Warchlaki #4.1 Spirits and Silent Sisters (writer and illustrator; collaborative work)
- 2018: Zeszyty komiksowe #25: Komiks w Internecie (writer and illustrator; collaborative work; Instytut Kultury Popularnej)
- 2019: Duże ilości naraz psów #2 (writer and illustrator; Demland; ISBN 978-83-948880-4-6)
- 2019: Kolce (writer and illustrator; Demland; ISBN 978-83-948880-7-7)
- 2019: Frykasy (writer and illustrator; Demland; ISBN 978-83-948880-6-0)
- 2020: Lodówka zdolnych dzieci (writer and illustrator; with Anna Krztoń; University of Poznań)
- 2020: Magowie (writer and illustrator; Demland; ISBN 978-83-948880-9-1)
- 2021: Minimalistyczna wystawa polskiego komiksu minimalistycznego. Dębski-Mazur-Świdziński (writer and illustrator; collaborative work; University of Poznań)
- 2021: Ostatnie drzewo (writer and illustrator; collaborative work; ISBN 978-83-956615-2-5)
- 2022: Mięsko (writer and illustrator; Demland; ISBN 978-83-964035-0-6)
- 2022: Sosy (writer and illustrator; Demland; ISBN 978-83-964035-1-3)
- 2023: Swawole (writer and illustrator; Demland; ISBN 978-83-964035-2-0)
- 2024: Czyjś syn (writer and illustrator; Demland; ISBN 978-83-964035-4-4)
- 2024: Kuce z Bronksu. Impreza Neispodzianka (writer and illustrator; Demland; ISBN 978-83-964035-3-7)
