= Jona Laks =

Israeli Holocaust survivor (born 1930)

- יונה לקס
- Pronunciation: Yona Laks
- Born: Jona Fuchs; 28 April 1930 (age 96); Lodz, Poland
- Known for: Holocaust survivor and Mengele twin

Jona Laks (Hebrew: יונה לקס, born 28 April 1930) is an Israeli Holocaust survivor who was subject to human experimentation by Josef Mengele at the Auschwitz concentration camp. After the war, she founded and served as chairwoman of the Organization of the Mengele Twins. In January 2015, she addressed the United Nations General Assembly at its International Day of Commemoration in Memory of the Victims of the Holocaust Memorial Ceremony. She has been featured in several documentary films.

== Biography ==
Jona was nine years old when Nazi Germany invaded Poland in September 1939. Jona and her family, residents of Łódź, were incarcerated in the Łódź Ghetto, from which her parents were deported to the Chelmno extermination camp in 1942. In August 1944 she and her two sisters, including her twin, Miriam, were sent to the Auschwitz concentration camp. Mengele, not recognizing she was a twin, sent the 14-year-old Jona in the direction of the gas chambers. However, when her older sister apprised Mengele of that fact, Jona and Miriam were sent to Mengele's "laboratory" for twins research. Jona was tattooed with the number A27725 and Miriam received the number A27700.

Mengele removed organs from people without anaesthetic, and if one twin died the other would be murdered.

— Jona Laks

With the evacuation of Auschwitz on January 27, 1945, Jona and Miriam were sent on a death march to the Ravensbrück concentration camp; they were later incarcerated in nearby Malchow. They were liberated near Leipzig on May 8, 1945. Jona and Miriam returned to Łódź, but following the 1946 Kielce pogrom they were taken to London and cared for by Jewish families. In 1948 Jona immigrated alone to Israel. She eventually resided in Tel Aviv with her husband.

Laks founded and serves as chairwoman of the Organization of the Mengele Twins. She addressed the United Nations General Assembly on the International Day of Commemoration in Memory of the Victims of the Holocaust, January 28, 2015, and participated in a United Nations Radio documentary of her life. She was also featured in the 2006 film Forgiving Dr. Mengele as a foil to the main protagonist, Eva Mozes Kor, another Mengele twin who publicly forgave Nazi perpetrators of the Holocaust. Unlike Kor, Laks contended that "some things cannot be forgiven".
