= Józef Diament =

Chairman of the Jewish Council of the Radom District

Józef Samuel Diament
- Born: February 8, 1894; Radom
- Died: August 10, 1942 (aged 48); Auschwitz concentration camp
- Office: Chairman of the Supreme Council of Elders of the Jewish Population of the Radom District
- Term: December 1939–28 April 1942
- Successor: Ludwik Fastman (unconfirmed)

Józef Samuel Diament (born 8 February 1894 in Radom, died 10 August 1942 in the Auschwitz concentration camp) was the chairman of the Supreme Council of Elders of the Jewish Population of the Radom District (Judenrat, overseeing the entire Radom District) from likely December 1939 to April 1942, and an advisor on social welfare to the head of the Radom District. Arrested on charges of economic abuses, he perished in the concentration camp at Auschwitz.

== Pre-War Life ==
Diament was an assimilated Radom Jew. At age 24, he formally changed his names from Szmul-Josek to Samuel Józef. His degree of assimilation is further evidenced by giving his daughters Polish names, Stefania and Henryka. Before World War II, he worked as an accountant and was a co-owner of an iron foundry, likely the Glinice foundry at 7 Średnia Street. He did not participate in the activities of the Jewish community.

== Jewish Social Self-Help Committee ==
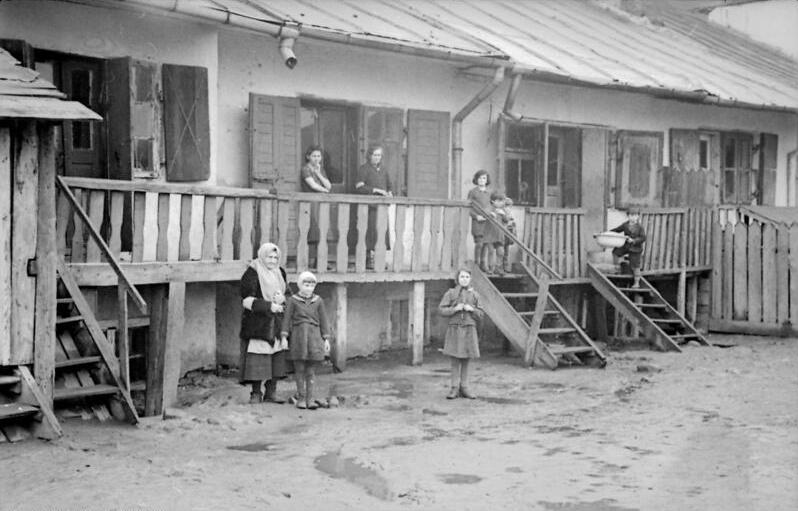
Jews of the Radom District, 1941

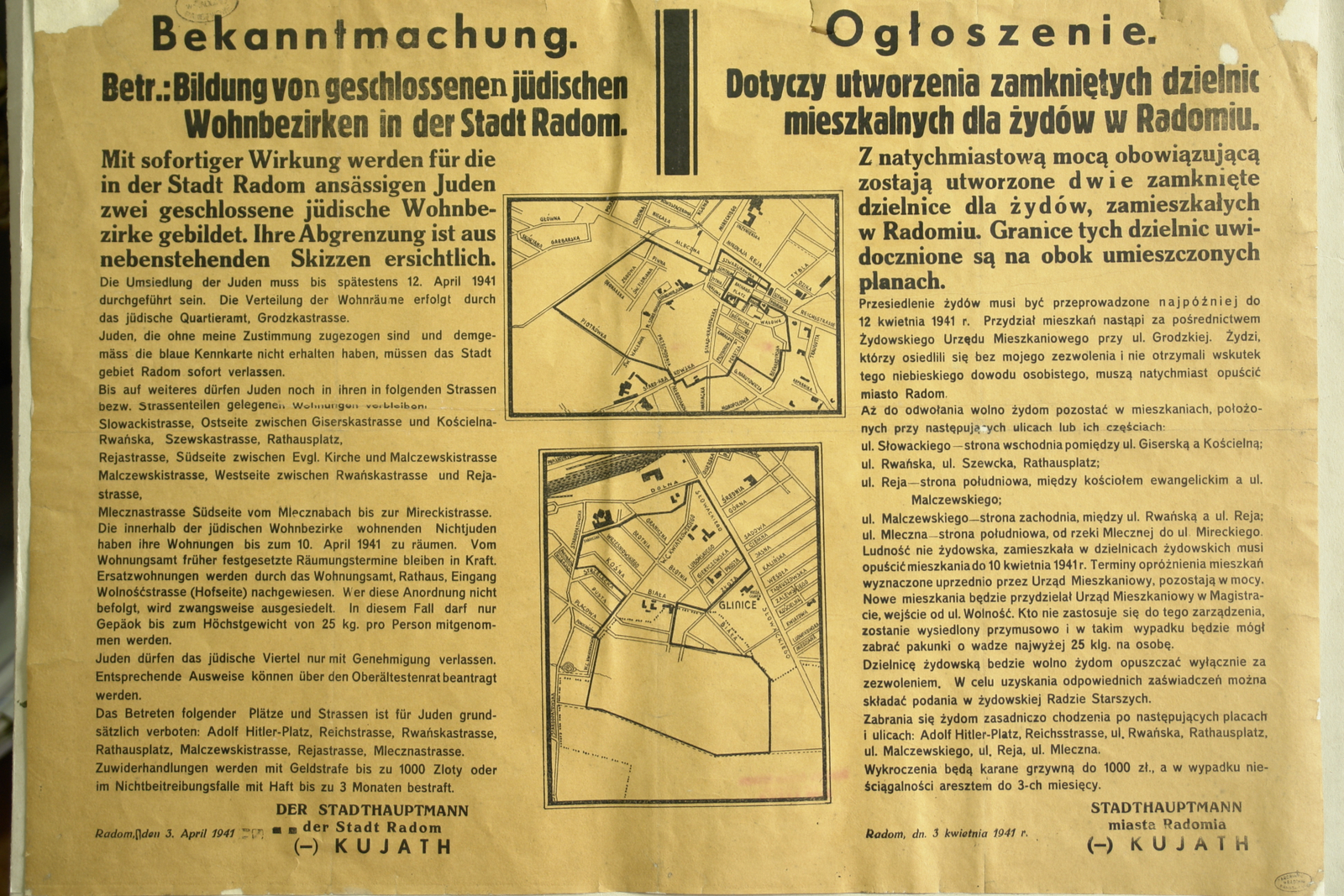
Poster announcing the establishment of the Radom Ghetto

In September 1939, Diament took on his first public role as deputy to Jakub Goldberg, chairman of the Temporary Jewish Committee. This committee, separated by the Germans from the Civic Committee formed after the pre-war authorities abandoned the city, supported needy Jewish residents of Radom. On 26 September 1939, he became chairman of the established Jewish Social Self-Help Committee, making him the primary representative of the city's Jewish community to the Germans. To Radom's Jews, he was largely unknown. The committee, among other duties, was responsible for paying high contributions to the Germans on behalf of local Jews. Diament participated in organizing material equivalents for financial contributions when Radom's Jews could not raise the required 300,000 złoty and 10,000 marks in October 1939. Escorted by the Gestapo as a committee representative, he traveled with a delegation to Łódź to purchase fabric, thread, and buttons, which were later used in Radom to produce underwear for the German army.

== Judenrat ==
In December 1939, following an order from General Governor Hans Frank, SS General Fritz Katzmann appointed Diament to establish the Jewish Council of Elders (Judenrat). Though still relatively unknown in the city, Diament selected respected members of the Jewish Social Self-Help Committee as his collaborators, transforming the committee into the Judenrat. This composition earned him significant trust from residents. The scope of the Judenrat's authority in its early period is unclear. It is uncertain whether it initially managed only the city or immediately served as the Supreme Council of Elders of the Jewish Population of the Radom District (Der Ober-Ältestenrat der Jüdischen Bevölkerung des Distrikts Radom), overseeing the entire district. Some sources mention two Judenrats in Radom (municipal and district), while others assert Diament led a single Judenrat representing the district's Jews. Regardless, Diament quickly became the primary representative of all Jewish Councils in the Radom District, managing an extensive administrative apparatus from Radom.

As an advisor on social welfare to the head of the Radom District (Der Beirat für die soziale Fürsorge beim Chef des Distrikts Radom), Diament collaborated with the Jewish Social Self-Help Organization and participated in its committee meetings. He leveraged his positions as Judenrat chairman and welfare advisor to address housing, medical, and material assistance for Jewish deportees arriving in the Radom District. He traveled by car across the district to personally oversee resettlement operations, closely cooperating with the Germans and often securing concessions. In January 1942, he persuaded the occupation authorities to abandon plans to deport Jews from rural areas such as Firlej, Jedlnia, Stromiec, Wierzbica, and Wolanów to ghettos in larger Jewish population centers. Instead, the Germans established small ghettos in these locations. Also in January 1942, Diament's intervention delayed the deportation of 30% of Jews living in Iłża. When German decisions could not be altered, Diament sought to ensure deportation actions occurred without German involvement (e.g., in Przytyk in March 1941) or secured the right to independently relocate deportees (e.g., Głowaczów, 1941).

Under Diament's leadership, the Judenrat operated the Jewish Hospital, an orphanage, and the Bekerman Old Age and Disabled Home. It supported the poor by distributing food and clothing. In October 1940, the council attempted to revive Jewish education in the city. From 1941, the Judenrat's role was limited to administrative functions, including in the Radom Ghetto, established in April 1941.

The Judenrat also served as a tool for German control over the Jewish population, collecting statistics and maintaining records, which facilitated further contributions, restrictions, and repressions. This led to postwar accusations by surviving Jews of collaboration and bribery against the Radom Judenrat and its chairman. On 1 December 1942, when an order was issued to forcibly deport 2,000 Jews from Radom, the Judenrat was tasked with compiling the deportation list. Some council members proposed targeting the poorest residents. Although the Council of Elders passed a resolution prohibiting poverty-based selection, Diament requested data from the Jewish Social Self-Help Organization on aid recipients. The deportation committee's lists included 271 poor families registered with the Jewish Social Self-Help Organization, causing a crisis in aid efforts as remaining Jews feared using Jewish Social Self-Help Organization services and sought, sometimes through bribes, to be removed from its records. Amid the scandal, Diament attempted to resign as social welfare advisor but his resignation was not accepted. He was also criticized for negligence and an extravagant lifestyle. Emanuel Ringelblum, in his Chronicle of the Warsaw Ghetto, citing third-party accounts, noted that in November 1941, while Diament was at a summer resort in Otwock, the Judenrat facilitated a Gestapo execution of 30 Jews from Baranavichy in Radom.

== Death ==
On 28 April 1942, Diament, his deputy Arnold Meryn, and other council members were arrested on charges of economic abuses and detained in Radom's prison. On 21 July 1942, they were sent to the Auschwitz concentration camp, where they perished.

== Bibliography ==
- Piątkowski, Sebastian (2006). Dni życia, dni śmierci: ludność żydowska w Radomiu w latach 1918–1950 [Days of Life, Days of Death: The Jewish Population in Radom, 1918–1950] (in Polish). Warsaw: National Directorate of State Archives. ISBN 83-89115-31-X.
