= Milton J. Nieuwsma =

Milton John Nieuwsma (pronounced "news-ma") (born September 5, 1941) is an American writer, journalist and filmmaker noted for his work on the Holocaust and early American history. His 1998 book Kinderlager, about three young concentration camp survivors, was the basis for the 2005 Emmy Award-winning documentary, Surviving Auschwitz: Children of the Shoah, which he wrote and co-produced. Nieuwsma won a second Emmy in 2006 for the film Defying Hitler.

== Early life ==
Nieuwsma was born in Sioux Falls, South Dakota, the son of John Nieuwsma, a Dutch Reformed minister, and Jean (née) Potter, a teacher. In 1945, after World War II, his family moved to Bellflower, California. At the age of 5, he met Corrie ten Boom, a Dutch-born concentration camp survivor and author of The Hiding Place, whose family had hidden Jews in their Netherlands home during the war. Ten Boom was a guest at the Nieuwsma parsonage in Bellflower. In a 2001 interview, Nieuwsma recalled "sitting on (ten Boom's) lap...listening to her talk and wondering to myself, 'Who is this woman?' She reminded me of my grandmother." Ten Boom inspired him to learn more about the Holocaust.

== Writing career ==
Nieuwsma started his writing career as a reporter for the Holland (Michigan) Evening Sentinel, while in high school. After graduating with an English degree from Hope College in 1963, he worked as a public information officer at Wayne State University in Detroit and hosted a weekly radio program, The Fifth Freedom, on WQRS-FM, a Detroit fine arts station. In the late 1970s, Nieuwsma began writing historical features and travel articles for the Chicago Tribune. In 1978, he received a master's degree from the University of Illinois Springfield.

In 1994, while teaching journalism at Rutgers University in New Jersey, Nieuwsma met Tova Friedman, believed to be the youngest Auschwitz survivor, which inspired him to write Kinderlager. Friedman is one of three children featured in the book. In 2001 Kinderlager was selected by the Hogere Europese Beroepen Opleiding (Institute for Higher European Studies) in The Hague as one of the top 10 books written on the Holocaust.

In 2005 the book was reissued under the title Surviving Auschwitz: Children of the Shoah as a companion to the PBS documentary which Nieuwsma wrote and co-produced. Released in 2005, the film received an Emmy Award from the Michigan chapter of the National Academy of Television Arts and Sciences for best historical documentary. The film also won a First Place Gold Camera Award at the International Film and Video Festival in Los Angeles. Today, Surviving Auschwitz is featured in many school-based Holocaust studies programs in the United States.

Nieuwsma won a second Emmy in 2006 for writing and co-producing Defying Hitler, a documentary about a Jewish fighter in the Polish Resistance.

In 2009, Hope College honored him with a Distinguished Alumni Award.

In addition to his work on the Holocaust, Nieuwsma is the writer and creator of the PBS series Inventing America: Conversations with the Founders (released in 2016). He is also the author of Inventing America (a companion book to the PBS series), Miracle on Chestnut Street (2021), and Dateline: World--20 Dispatches from the Earth and One from Hell (2023).

== Personal life ==
Since 1997 Nieuwsma has lived in Holland, Michigan, where he continues to write. He and his wife, the former Marilee Gordon (m. February 1, 1964), have three children, Jonathan, Greg and Elizabeth, and seven grandchildren.

== Sources ==
- Who's Who in America (63rd ed., 2009)
- Who's Who in the World (26th ed., 2009)
- Contemporary Authors (vol. 213, 2004)
- Chicago Tribune (Jan. 30, 2005)
- Grand Rapids Press (Apr. 25, 2006)
- Holland Sentinel (Nov. 4, 2001)
- Note: For critical reviews of Nieuwsma's work, see Contemporary Authors (vol. 213, 2004, pp. 306–307); Something About the Author (vol. 142, 2004, pp. 140–141).
