= Leap into Darkness =

- Author: Leo Bretholz; Michael Olesker
- Original title: Leap into Darkness: Seven Years on the Run in Wartime Europe
- Language: English
- Genre: Memoir
- Publisher: Woodholme House Publishers (hardback); Anchor Books (paperback)
- Publication date: 1998
- Publication place: United States
- Media type: Print (hardback & paperback)
- Pages: 263 pp
- ISBN: 0385497059

Leap into Darkness is a 1998 memoir by Holocaust survivor Leo Bretholz and co-author Michael Olesker, in the vein of Night by Elie Wiesel or My Brother's Voice (2003) by Stephen Nasser, in which he recounts the astounding story of his surviving the Holocaust as a young man owing to his wits, stomach for risk taking and well developed flight instinct.

== Synopsis ==
The book begins with the Anschluss, Hitler's entry into Austria in 1938. The book recounts Bretholz's early life and the beginning of the war, as well as the seven years he spent on the run. Throughout the book he escapes the Nazi Regime several times, including from a train that was headed towards Auschwitz.

Bretholz was 17 when the Germans took over his native Austria. His mother, more realistic than other relatives, saw disaster and insisted that he escape, which is what he did for the next seven years, traveling through Germany, Luxembourg, France and briefly, Switzerland, to jails and numerous internment camps. Bretholz relied often on his youthful agility and daring to save himself from much worse; he escaped from a train headed for Auschwitz in 1942.

He spent the last years of the war working for the French Resistance, emigrating in 1947 to Baltimore, where he ran a bookstore (frequented by coauthor and Baltimore Sun columnist Olesker). In one story, he tells of a young female friend who was menaced by a gendarme while he is forced to stay hidden, "crouched on the floor, helpless, emasculated, sickened." Bretholz is also observant of the Austrians ("'First victims,' they will call themselves when the world loses its memory."); opportunistic Swiss; and the French, so many of whom claimed to be Resistance. "I was now a miraculous athlete, a professional escape artist, a young man in perpetual flight. I was indomitable. Also, I was too terrified not to run for my life."

== Analysis ==
Young Leo's journey from Vienna to Brooklyn, New York via Chalus, France is nothing short of amazing. It includes so many harrowing escapes that Leo calls himself 'a professional escape artist'. His flight and survival for seven years in occupied Europe spanned several countries - Austria, Germany, Luxembourg, Switzerland, Belgium and France. His youth and athletic ability clearly contributed to his success. Moreover, Leo was a student of human nature and spoke fluent German, French and Yiddish, as well as, passable Flemish. Arrested and brought before an SS officer for questioning, at the railway station in Limogenes, France, while observing a transport of Jewish prisoners, Leo possessed false identification papers. However, Leo knew that if the German officer asked him to drop his pants, his circumcision would betray him as a Jew. Watching the German officer becoming increasingly irritated as he struggled to interrogate Leo in broken French, Leo, a native of Vienna volunteered that he spoke German. The SS officer visible relaxed and appeared almost grateful. He ended up merely slapping Leo and ordered him to get out of his sight, but did not arrest him.
