= Donja Zelina =

- Village
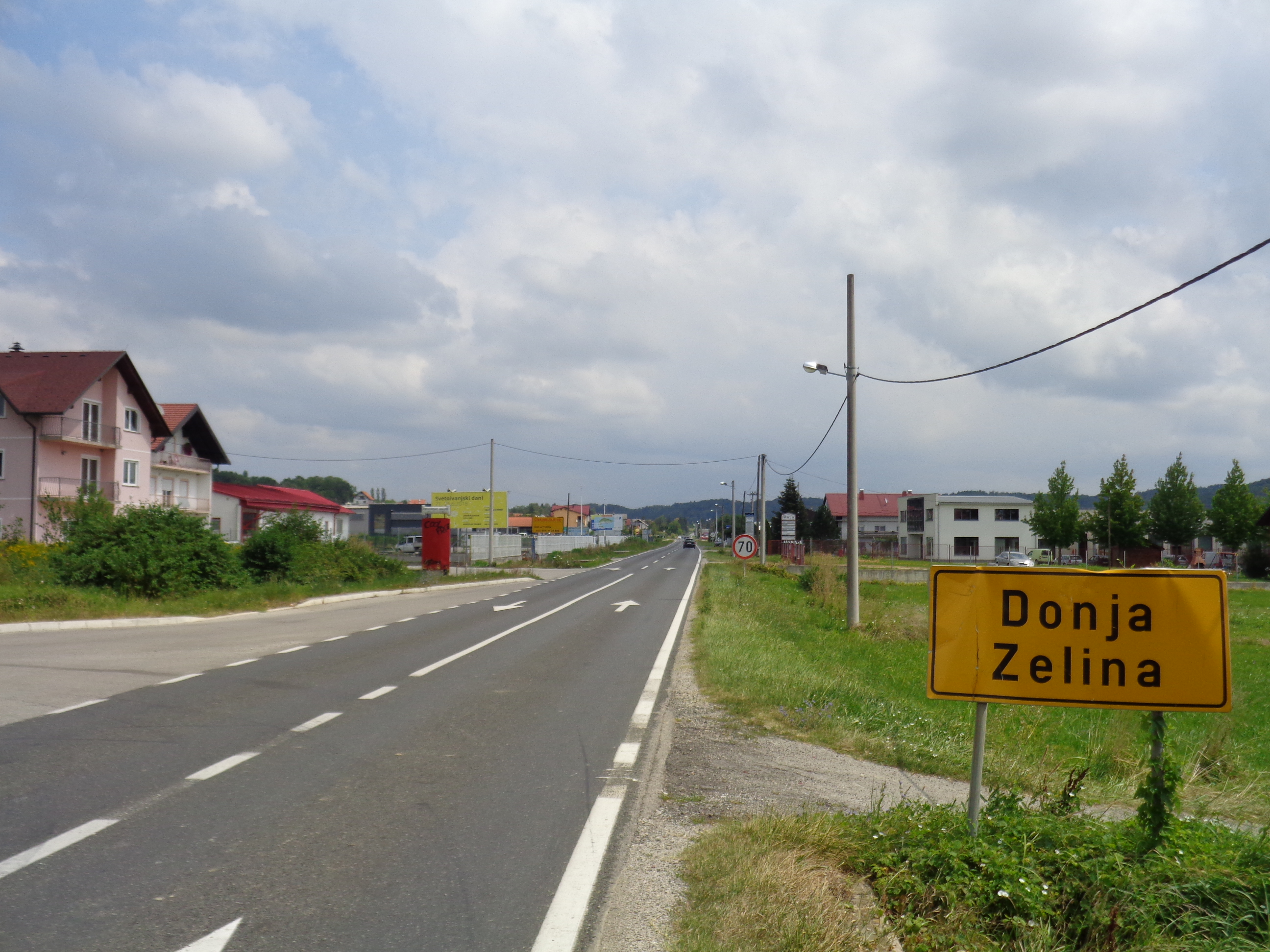
- Fingerposts in Donja Zelina

- Location within Croatia
- Coordinates: 45.911737°N 16.233434°E
- Country: Croatia
- County: Zagreb County
- Municipality: Sveti Ivan Zelina

Area
  - Total: 4.6 km^{2} (1.8 sq mi)

Population (2021)
  - Total: 786
  - Density: 170/km^{2} (440/sq mi)
- Time zone: UTC+1 (CET)
  - Summer (DST): UTC+2 (CEST)

Donja Zelina is a village in Croatia. It is connected by the D3 highway.

== Literature ==
- Obad Šćitaroci, Mladen; Bojanić Obad Šćitaroci, Bojana; Dundović, Boris (2013). "Manors and Gardens in Northern Croatia in the Age of Historicism" (PDF). Centropa. pp. 175–186. ISSN 1532-5563.
