= Inge Weiss =

German–American dancer and choreographer (1922–2004)

- Born: Ingeborg Złoczewski; 22 June 1922; Hanover, Germany
- Died: 21 October 2004 (aged 82); Hallandale, Florida, U.S.
- Occupations: Dancer, choreographer
- Children: 2 sons

Ingeborg Weiss (née Złoczewski; 22 June 1922 – 21 October 2004) was a German–American dancer and choreographer. She danced with Mary Wigman, one of the early pioneers of modern dance. She retired from Stanford University in the 1990s.

== Early life ==
Ingeborg Złoczewski was born in Hanover, Germany on 22 June 1922. Her mother was born in Germany while her father, born in Warta, Poland, worked in Germany manufacturing men's clothing. She had a Jewish education and her family were active in the Jewish community.

== World War II ==
In October 1938, her family were deported to Poland, ending up in Spoczynek living with relatives in crowded stables. Her family were then deported to Kraków and lived in poor conditions until 1941. In 1944, she was deported to Auschwitz and then on to Bergen-Belsen in September 1944, where she got a job distributing bread as she was able to speak German. During her time in the camp, she contracted typhoid prior to liberation, where she then recovered in the German officers' quarters before returning to Hannover in 1946.

== Post war ==
In 1947, she married Jack Weiss (1910–2007), and gave birth to a son, Michael, in 1948. She moved to the United States in September 1949, settling in Cleveland, Ohio. Weiss died in Hallandale, Florida on 21 October 2004, at the age of 82.
