= Rosette Wolczak =

Jewish child victim of the Holocaust

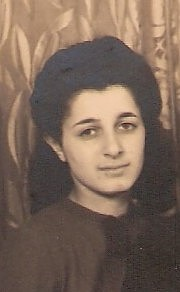
- Born: 19 March 1928
- Died: 23 November 1943 (aged 15); Auschwitz-Birkenau, German-occupied Poland
- Other name: Rose Wolczak

Rosette "Rose" Wolczak (19 March 1928 – 23 November 1943) was a Jewish girl murdered in the Holocaust. Born in France in 1928, she came to Geneva, Switzerland, in 1943 as a refugee, and was expelled for what the Swiss authorities ruled to be indecent behavior. She was sent to the Auschwitz concentration camp, where she was gassed upon her arrival in November 1943.

== Early life ==
Rosette (Rose) Wolczak was the daughter of Felix Wolczak and Zlata Welner, both Jews originating from Łódź, Poland. Felix Wolczak's father emigrated from Poland because of antisemitism and poverty. He married Zlata Welner in October 1925 and Rosette was born in 1928 in Paris, followed several years after by Nathan. They lived at the 19th Pont-aux-Choux road, in the 3rd arrondissement of Paris. Rosette's father was involved in worker's trade unions and in a Jewish political party.

Rosette became French in 1933. She went to school in Paris, first at the girls primary school Rue Debelleyme, then at the rue de Montmorency, not far from Le Marais, where a large concentration of Jews resided. In 1941, the family left Paris for Lyon, situated in the zone libre, because of the restrictions targeting the Jewish community, and in particular the obligation for any Jew to be registered. The family did not comply to this legal obligation and did not show up at the police station on the Saint Ours road, fleeing in the direction of Lyon instead.

Rosette's parents decided to send her to one of her cousins who lived in Geneva and could host her. During World War II, Geneva was the transit town for 42 percent of new refugees who sought refuge in Switzerland. The official policy was to limit the tide of incoming refugees in Switzerland. As of 13 August 1942, a Swiss Federal Council ruling stipulated that persons fleeing for racial reasons could not be considered as political refugees. However, children under 16 years of age could not be repelled at the frontier. Rosette was 15 in 1943. She probably left with the network of the Zionist Youth Movement with a smuggler named Bella Wending, presenting herself under a false identity. Rosette's father had also in the past participated in the conveying of Jewish children and knew the network. There were three main networks attempting to smuggle so-called non-expellable refugees at the Franco-Swiss border near Geneva. Approximately 1100 children passed the border with these networks between February 1943 and July 1944.

== Arrival in Geneva ==
Rosette Wolczak left Grenoble to join Annecy, leaving this town on 24 September 1943. She arrived in Saint-Julien-en-Genevois in Haute-Savoie by coach, this village being in the zone libre. A smuggler took them to cross the wired fences between the villages of Soral and Certoux. Rosette was arrested by a Swiss border-guide, who wrote an arrest report in Sézenove. She was taken to the police station in Bernex and then transferred to the Cropettes screening in Geneva, without her being able to contact her cousin residing in Geneva. She indicated his address on the declaration she made to the authorities in charge of examining her request on 27 September 1943. Her cousin, C. Neufeld, lived at Gaspard Valette Avenue, 10, in Geneva.

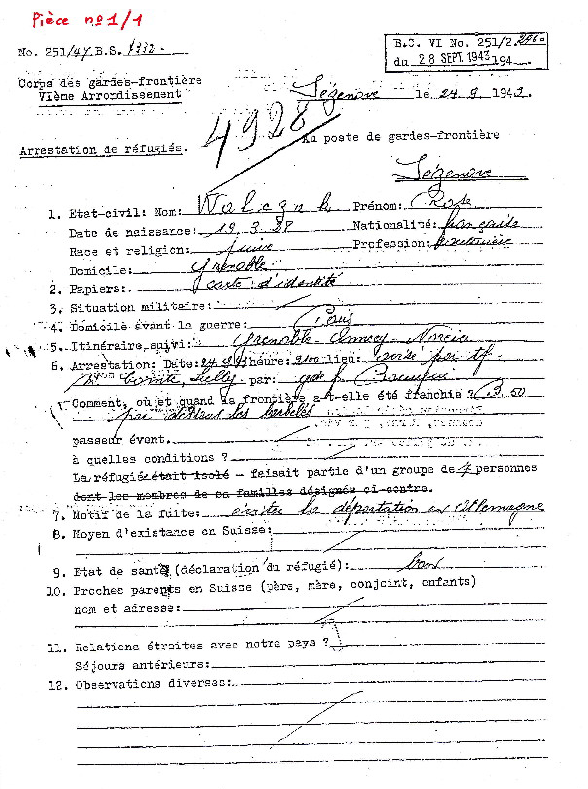
Arrest report of Rosette Wolczak by Swiss border guard of the Geneva canton in 1943

The Cropette screening center was located in a primary school used as a shelter center for clandestine refugees arriving in Switzerland during World War II. Forty-two percent of the Jewish refugees seeking asylum in Switzerland transited through Geneva in 1943. The cantonal archives indicate that 2526 persons transited there, of which 1622 were Jewish. Among these, 80 were expelled and 17 deported to German concentration camps.

Rosette Wolczak was a minor upon her arrival in Geneva, so she received a temporary authorisation to stay in Switzerland. She was sent to the transit camp of Plantaporrêts, when she had to wait to pass under the responsibility of the federal department of justice and police. She was obliged to give away the 30 francs she had to the authorities, and to comply with strict rules.

== Deportation to Auschwitz ==
=== Arrest for "indecent behavior" ===
Rosette was caught in a dormitory lying on straw with a young French soldier who had escaped from Germany. The Swiss soldier who found them made a report; during the questioning, Rosette revealed that she had been abused by another man. The man in question then indicated that Rosette had had sexual relations with four military guards during the Jewish New Year celebration of Rosh Hashanah. She was arrested for indecent behavior and sent to the Saint Antoine Prison.

=== Expulsion to the French border ===
Beginning on 19 December 1942, a police ruling stipulated that any given person admitted temporarily and behaving incorrectly could be taken to the border and expelled. On 13 October, the Colonel Chenevière gave the order to expel Rosette Wolczak to the border, and the First Lieutenant Daniel Odier wrote a note demanding the execution of the sentence as quickly as possible in order to "set an example". Rosette Wolczak was finally sent away for disciplinary reasons on 16 October 1943.

=== Arrest and deportation ===
With the 30 francs that were given back to her by the prison authorities, she crossed the frontier at the Moulin de la Grave with three other refugees. She was arrested on 19 October 1943 and sent by the German border guards to the Pax hotel in Annemasse. From there, she was transferred to the Drancy internment camp, arriving on 26 October 1943. She received the matricule number 7114, and had to give away the 50 francs that she owned at that point.

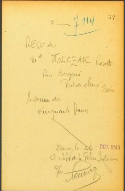
Receipt given to Rosette Wolczak to the Drancy authorities

She was deported to Auschwitz on 20 November 1943 in the deportation convoy number 62. After the call assembling the deportees at half past six in the morning, the convoy left the Bobigny station at eleven-fifty, taking away 1 200 persons, including 640 men, 560 women, and 164 children under eighteen years of age. Wolczak was in the same convoy as Nicole Alexandre, whom Françoise Verny commemorates in the book Serons-nous vivantes le 2 janvier 1950?. Nineteen young Jews were able to escape from the train by jumping off, among them the future Conseiller d'état Jean Cahen-Salvador.

Wolczak arrived in Auschwitz on 23 November 1943. According to deportee testimonials, elderly people and children under 16 years of age were generally gassed upon arrival, as they were considered inept to work. Rosette was gassed to death on the same day as her arrival.

== Fate of family members ==
Rosette Wolczak's parents were informed of their daughter's arrival in Switzerland on 18 October 1943, a few days after she had been expelled. The family left Pont-de-Claix following the takeover of the region by the Germans. They established themselves at Villette-d'Anthon, located 15 kilometres (9.3 mi) away from Voiron, and remained there until the end of the war, protected by the villagers. The Wolczaks returned to Paris after the liberation of France and started looking for their daughter. A letter was sent to Comité Suisse de recherche des enfants sans adresse, an association searching for child refugees in Switzerland, but no answer was forthcoming. On 18 July 1945, Rosette's brother, Nathan, who contacted the OSE in Geneva, received a letter informing him of the death of his sister. The family left France for Israel in 1952.

In 2000, Rosette's brother received from the cantonal archives a copy of Rosette's file. The administrative file is found at the Geneva cantonal archives among the files of more than 20,000 persons arrested between 1942 and the end of the war by the police. Rosette's file number is CH.AEG Justice et police. Ef/2-041-No4928 and contains 30 pages.

== Memorials ==
=== Montmorency school in Paris ===
In 2007, following an inventory work of Jewish children deported during World War II, a memorial was inaugurated in Rosette's school in Paris in the 3rd arrondissement.

=== Theater adaptation ===
Michel Beretti received funds from the Foundation for the memory of the Shoah victims to adapt Rosette's story for the theater in 2012. His work is archived under the tag "4928 project", a reference to the number of Rosette's administrative file in the Geneva cantonal archives.

=== Cropettes school in Geneva ===
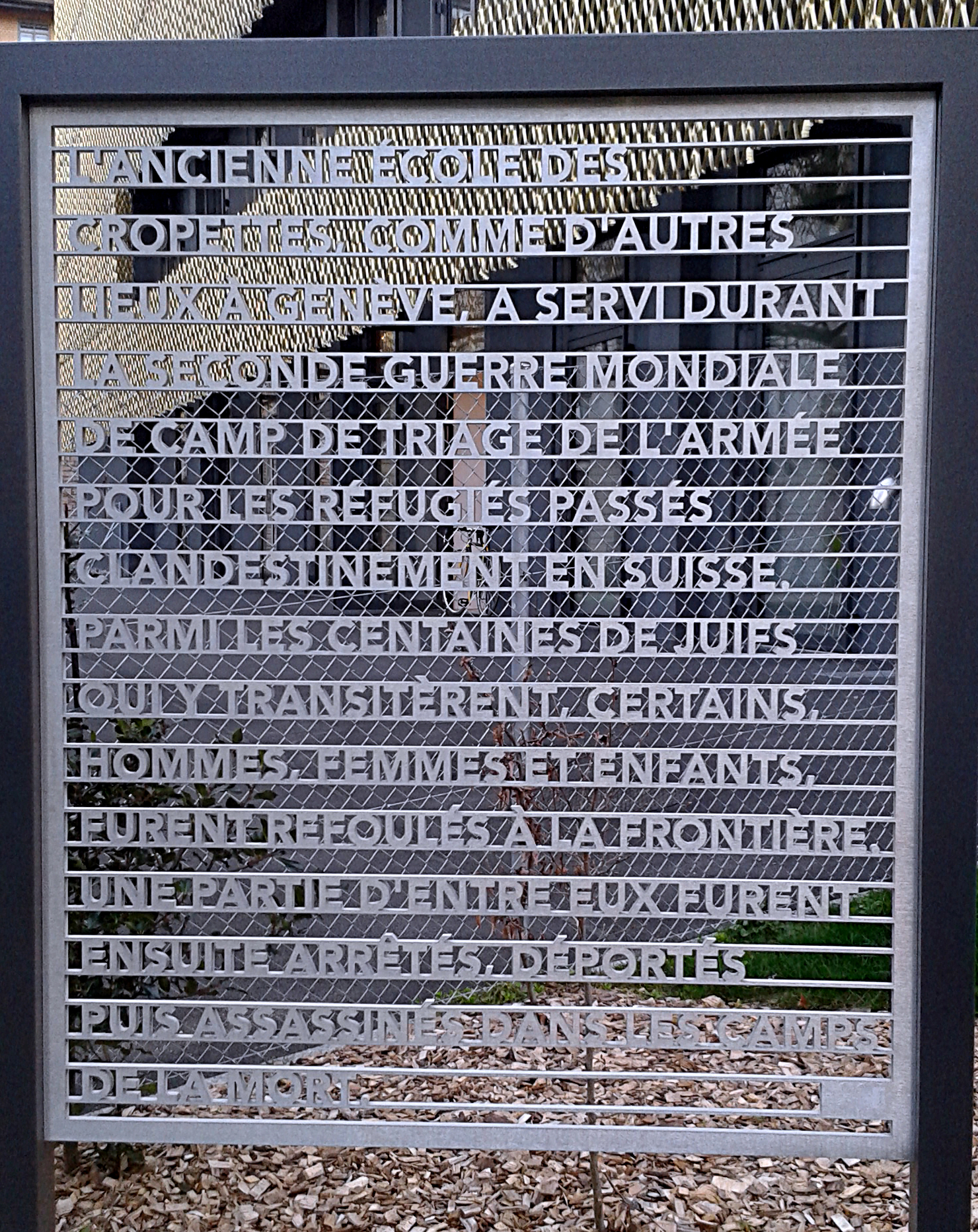
Memorial at the Cropette primary school in Geneva

On Wednesday 27 January 2016, a memorial to the Jewish victims of the Holocaust was unveiled next to the Cropettes primary school in Geneva. This memorial is the first of the kind in Switzerland according to the CICAD. This initiative was made in conjunction with the publication of a book by Swiss journalist Claude Torracinta recalling Rosette Wolczak's history.

== Notes ==
=== Sources ===
- Torracinta, Claude (2016). Rosette, pour l'exemple (in French). Genève: Éditions Slatkine. ISBN 978-2-8321-0717-1.
