= Michael Olesker =

American journalist and author

Michael Olesker (born 1945) is a former syndicated columnist for The Baltimore Sun newspaper in Baltimore, Maryland, and a book author.

Olesker attended the University of Maryland where he was on the staff of the school newspaper, The Diamondback, serving as the sports page editor. Olesker started writing for the Baltimore News-American in 1978, prior to becoming a Baltimore Sun writer between 1979–2006. He was also a commentator on WJZ-TV from 1983 through December 2002, and his columns were syndicated in other newspapers such as Newsday and the Pittsburgh Post-Gazette. Olesker resigned from the Sun on January 4, 2006, after it was alleged that his columns contained passages plagiarized from articles at other newspapers. After leaving The Baltimore Sun, Olesker was a columnist for The Baltimore Examiner until that newspaper ceased publication in 2009.

Olesker is known for his liberal viewpoints and for his criticism of the administration of Maryland Governor Robert L. Ehrlich Jr. (R), whose press office in November 2004 issued an executive order banning state executive employees from talking with Olesker. The Sun unsuccessfully sued over the ban, in a case decided by the 4th U.S. Circuit Court of Appeals. The Maryland Lieutenant Governor Michael Steele also accused Olesker of making up quotes.

Olesker is the author of Journeys to the Heart of Baltimore (Johns Hopkins University Press, 2001, ISBN 9780801867545) and co-authored Leap into Darkness, a 1998 memoir of a Holocaust survivor. His other books include:

- The Colts' Baltimore: A City and Its Love Affair in the 1950s (ISBN 9780801890628)
- Front Stoops in the Fifties: Baltimore Legends Come of Age (ISBN 9781421411606)
- Baltimore: If You Live Here, You’re Home

He was an extra in the 5th season of HBO's The Wire.
