= Ludmila Slavíková =

Czech mineralogist (1890–1943)

- Born: Ludmila Kaplanová; 23 February 1890; Prague, Austria-Hungary
- Died: 18 February 1943 (aged 52); Auschwitz concentration camp, Poland
- Other name: Ludmila Slavíková-Kaplanová
- Education: Charles University in Prague
- Occupations: Geologist, mineralogist, crystallographer
- Spouse: František Slavík

Ludmila Slavíková or Ludmila Slavíková-Kaplanová (23 February 1890 – 18 February 1943) was a Czech geologist, mineralogist and crystallographer. She was director of the Department of Mineralogy and Petrology at the National Museum in Prague. After the German occupation of Czechoslovakia, she became active in the resistance. Arrested in February 1943, she was deported to the Auschwitz concentration camp where she died shortly thereafter.

== Life and work ==
Ludmila Kaplanová was born in Prague to Viktorin Kaplan and Bohumila Kaplanová-Holoubková in 1890. She was educated in Prague, which was then part of Austria-Hungary. She studied science at Charles University in Prague and earned a Ph.D. in mathematics and physics in 1914. As part of her thesis work, she investigated pyrargyrite crystals. She briefly worked as a school teacher in Prague and Pardubice. In 1917, she married František Slavík, professor of mineralogy at the Czech University of Prague, and she collaborated with him in the publication of a monograph on the Ordovician iron ore deposits of Bohemia. Between 1921 and 1939, she worked at the National Museum in Prague, where she headed the Department of Mineralogy and Petrology.

Her research work covered various topics, such as the study of crystals of organic compounds and minerals from Czechoslovakia, among others. She was the author of several scientific publications and textbooks on mineralogy. For the centenary of the National Museum in Prague, she wrote a series of articles on the history of the museum's mineral collections.

In 1943, she and her husband were detained by the Nazis for their resistance activities. Two weeks after her arrest, Slavíková died in the Auschwitz concentration camp.
