= Gerald Jacobs =

Gerald Jacobs is a British author and the literary editor of The Jewish Chronicle. His book Sacred Games, an account of a Hungarian Jew, Nicholas (Miklós) Hammer (1920–2003), a Holocaust survivor, was published in 1995. Hammer was a Hungarian Jew conscripted into the Hungarian Jewish forced labour Battalion in 1944. The book recounts Hammer's subsequent time in a Nazi ghetto for Jews, and his suffering in Birkenau.

Nine Love Letters is Jacobs's first novel, published in 2016. It tells the story of two Jewish refugee families whose lives unexpectedly converge in post-war London.

Jacobs is the father of electronic musician Ben Jacobs, who performs as Max Tundra, and Becky Jacobs, a member of the band Tunng.

== Bibliography ==
- Judi Dench: A Great Deal Of Laughter - the authorised biography, Gerald Jacobs, Little, Brown and Company, 1985, ISBN 978-0-70-883007-9
- Sacred Games, Gerald Jacobs, Penguin, 1995, ISBN 978-0-14-024243-0
- Nine Love Letters, Gerald Jacobs, Quartet Books, 2016, ISBN 978-0-70-437422-5
- Pomeranski, Gerald Jacobs, 2020
