= Tadeusz Debski =

Polish historian and concentration camp survivor

Tadeusz Debski (1921–2011) was a historian and a Polish survivor of the Nazi concentration camps, as well as the oldest person to receive a doctorate at the University of Illinois at Chicago. His thesis, "The Battlefield of Ideas: Nazi Concentration Camps and Their Polish Prisoners," was published in 2001 by East European Monographs and distributed by Columbia University Press, and was included in the Holocaust and Genocide Studies list of recently published works. His work offers testimony and analysis of the Nazi concentration camps as an organizational tool intended to serve multiple purposes, among them being a source of slave labor and a method of terror. Debski’s work helped "introduce to Western scholarship the less well-known Polish scholarship, and to explain the special solidarity that existed within the Polish prisoner population of the camps.".

Born in 1921, he was 18 when the Germans invaded Poland in 1939. He was a member of the Home Army (Polish underground army), and was arrested by the Gestapo in early 1940 and sent to Auschwitz. After 3 weeks there, he was transferred to the Flossenbürg concentration camp where he spent the remainder of the war. His experiences before and during the war are documented in an almost 4 hour interview with the USC Shoah Foundation.

He immigrated to Chicago in 1953, after having lived in a post-war displaced persons camp and for a time in Belgium, where many displaced persons were offered work in coal mines, a program not without controversy. During his life in the United States he was an avid photographer and captured some important moments in the 1960s civil rights era, such as the Chicago Black Easter Parade of April 7, 1969, photographing Jesse Jackson on the "Black Sheep" float. After retiring at the age of 65, he pursued a college degree, culminating in a PhD awarded in 1998 by the UIC Department of History. He died in 2011 at the age of 89, before he could complete his second monograph.
