= Wiesław Kielar =

Auschwitz survivor

- Born: August 12, 1919
- Died: June 1, 1990 (aged 70)
- Known for: Author, filmmaker

Wiesław Kielar (Polish pronunciation: [ˈvʲjɛs.waf ˈkʲjɛ.lar], 12 August 1919 – 1 June 1990) was a Polish author, filmmaker, and prisoner in the concentration camp Auschwitz.

== Arrest and Career ==
Kielar was arrested at the beginning of 1940 in Jarosław and was one of the first prisoners of concentration camp Auschwitz (identification number 290). He spent almost five years in different parts of the complex. He held various positions, including nurse, writer and "prison senior". After the Second World War he went to the National Film School in Łódź and worked as a filmmaker. About his stay in Auschwitz, he wrote the memoir Anus Mundi: 1,500 Days in Auschwitz/Birkenau. (ISBN 0812909216)
