= Birkenau (painting) =

2014 cycle of four paintings by Gerhard Richter

- Artist: Gerhard Richter
- Year: 2014
- Catalogue: 937
- Medium: Oil on canvas
- Movement: Abstract
- Dimensions: 260 cm × 200 cm (100 in × 79 in)
- Location: Neue Nationalgalerie (permanent loan), Berlin

Birkenau is a cycle of four paintings by Gerhard Richter from 2014. The name Birkenau refers to the Auschwitz-Birkenau concentration camp. Richter transferred four photographs, presumably taken by concentration camp inmate Alberto Errera, depicting the burning of the bodies of murdered Jews in a forest and naked women on the way to the gas chamber, onto four canvases. He gradually painted over the figurative images with a brush and the colors black, gray, green and red and further processed them with a squeegee.

The paintings remain off the art market. Richter's originals have been in the rooms of the Neue Nationalgalerie since 31 March 2023 as part of the Gerhard Richter exhibition. 100 works for Berlin are exhibited and will remain in Berlin on permanent loan. With the completion of the new museum right next to it, they will be on display there. There are also two additional full-size photo versions of the Birkenau cycle. Gerhard Richter provided a version to the International Auschwitz Committee. Following the completion of a new building on site, the work at Auschwitz-Birkenau will be open to the public. Another direct print on aluminum hangs in the entrance hall of the Reichstag building.

== Description ==
The four pictures form the 937th group of Richter's work, they are numbered 937/1–4. "The color increases from picture to picture. The first, viewed from left to right, shows mostly black, white and gray tones. The second has a red trace almost in the middle. In the third, the green tones increase, in the last they predominate in comparison to the red. The pictures are large, even huge, they create a mood, and it is dark." "The pictures have an effect with the structures that intertwine horizontally and vertically darker than many of Richter's other squeegee paintings." Benjamin Buchloh registers a reserved reduction to the complementary colors red and green and the non-colors black and white, in contrast to the usual color opulence of other abstract paintings by Richter.

The four paintings

The photographic reproductions of the four images (No. 937 B) are each divided into four rectangles.

== History ==
According to his own statements, Richter, who grew up in the German Democratic Republic, only saw photos from concentration camps relatively late as a student and was then confronted with documentary photos from the camps as a student at the Dresden Academy of Fine Arts. Since then he has repeatedly and artistically dealt with the topics of Nazi terror, extermination camps, victims and perpetrators in different ways. In his "Atlas", the collection of photographs, newspaper clippings and sketches that the artist has arranged on loose sheets of paper since the mid-1960s and which serves as a source for his paintings, photographs of concentration camps have been found since 1967.

The four photographs taken in the camp on which Birkenau is based were published in connection with a review of Georges Didi-Huberman's book Images Despite Everything from 2008 in the Frankfurter Allgemeine Zeitung. From 2014 onwards, Richter worked more intensively on these photographs of the Jewish prisoner who had secretly taken the photos and who, like his helpers who smuggled the photos out of the camp, were murdered in Birkenau.

Richter first transferred the photos onto canvas with a brush, an attempt that, in his opinion, failed. "There are photos that I could only make into bad pictures if I copied them. And these four photos are so good that I can only leave them as is. You can describe them or dedicate music to them or, if it goes well, dedicate an abstract picture." In the following work steps, he repeatedly painted over the pictures, scraped off paint, reapplied gray, brown, black and white, as well as red and green, until the original pictures had completely disappeared under an abstract-looking coating. "This process is nothing unusual, so paint objectively and end up abstract." He changed the original name - Vier abstrakte Bilder (Four Abstract Pictures) - after a period of reflection in Birkenau, thereby explaining their origin and historical reference, but without visual traces of the underlying photographs.

On 5 September 2017, the Reichstag in Berlin received the Birkenau paintings in a photographic version on aluminum panels. These pictures hang as a donation in the west entrance hall of the Reichstag building with a view of the plenary hall, directly opposite Richter's installation Schwarz, Rot, Gold (1999). In exhibitions the pictures usually hang next to each other; in the Reichstag they are presented one above the other.

The Birkenau series is one of around 100 works that were included in the Gerhard Richter Art Foundation, which was founded in 2020.

In October 2021, Gerhard Richter decided to make his Birkenau images permanently available to the International Auschwitz Committee. Currently, the cycle is on permanent display in an exhibition pavilion on the grounds of the International Youth Meeting Center in Oświęcim/Auschwitz, around 2 kilometers from the Auschwitz II-Birkenau site. The pavilion was built according to a design by the artist. In 2024, an edition of the works as prints on metal plate, made and donated by Richter, went on display at the Centre.

== Exhibitions ==
The four pictures were shown for the first time in the Albertinum in Dresden under the title Abstrakten Bilder (Abstract Pictures) as part of the exhibition "Gerhard Richter. Neupräsentation im Albertinum". In this exhibition, Richter hung photographic reproductions in their original size alongside the abstract images. In February 2016, the series was part of an exhibition at the Museum Frieder Burda in Baden-Baden for the first time under the title „Birkenau”. In her essay, Adrienne Braun described the Baden-Baden exhibition as having an “almost” documentary character because it was supplemented by photographs from Richter's collection of Nazi terror, which he collected in his “Atlas”. The exhibition was controversially discussed in the media and Richter et al. the accusation was made that “he would illustrate the Holocaust and thus give the horror an artistic form”. In 2016/17 the images were exhibited at the Jewish Museum and Tolerance Center in Moscow, then in Prague and then at the Queensland Art Gallery in Brisbane. In the New York exhibition “Gerhard Richter: Painting After All” in 2020, the cycle was shown in its own room. The original panels were juxtaposed with digitized prints, similar to those in Dresden. In addition, the original photos from the Auschwitz archive were shown as digital prints for the first time.

The Alte Nationalgalerie in Berlin is showing the picture cycle under the title Reflections on Painting. Gerhard Richter's 'Birkenau' cycle" from 16 March to 3 October 2021. Here too, the exhibition is supplemented by reproductions of the original photos.

== Reception ==
It was repeatedly pointed out that one cannot represent or paint the unimaginable, the Holocaust; one of the most prominent representatives of this view was the documentary film director Claude Lanzmann. Richter apparently stuck to this. Nevertheless, for the art critic Julia Voss there is no doubt that the reference to Auschwitz charges the images and gives them a meaning that painting alone does not give them. The philosopher and translator Nora Bierich concludes her critical essay on the short reception history of the cycle with the words: "Perhaps Auschwitz can be translated into abstract images, but then these should remain in the abstraction, and their alleged content should not be constantly discussed". The art critic Hanno Rauterburg, on the other hand, complained that the fundamental openness and interpretability of the images made Birkenau a myth.

== Literature ==
- Gerhard Richter: Birkenau. 93 Details aus meinem Bild „Birkenau“. König, Köln 2015, ISBN 978-3-86335-775-7.
- Benjamin H. D. Buchloh: Gerhard Richter's Birkenau Paintings. König, Köln 2016, ISBN 978-3-86335-886-0.
- Gerhard Richter Kunststiftung. Nachwort von Dietmar Elger. König, Köln 2020, ISBN 978-3-7533-0047-4.
- Birkenau. Mit Beiträgen von Helmut Friedel und Georges Didi-Huberman. Katalog. Museum Frieder Burda, Baden-Baden. König, Köln 2016.
