= Alberto Errera =

Greek-Jewish officer (1913–1944)

Captain Alberto Errera
- Αλβέρτος Ερρέρα
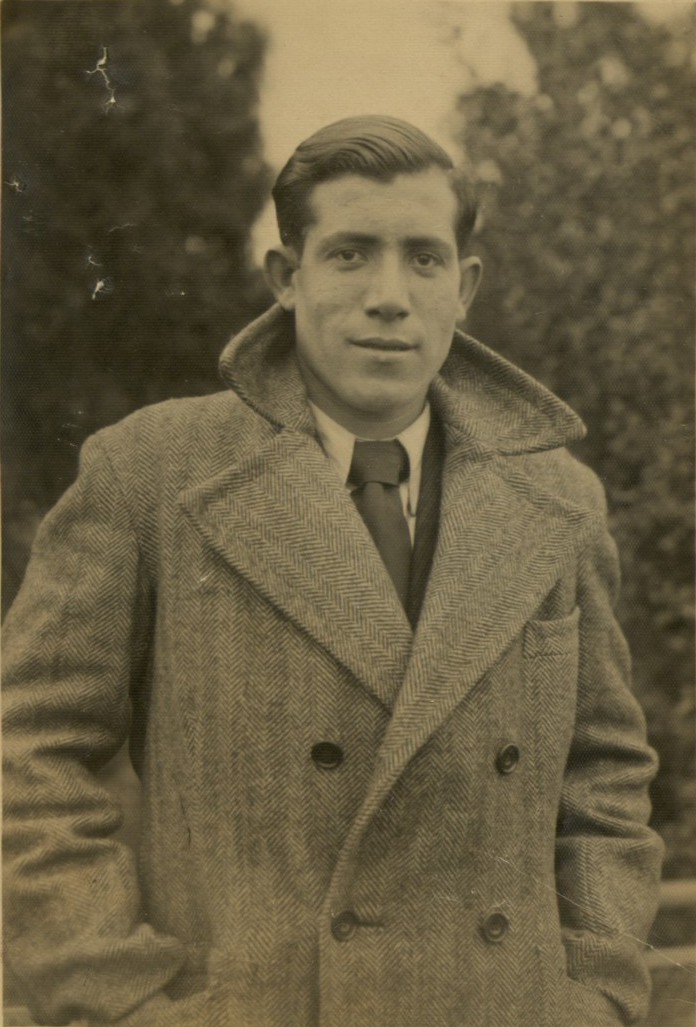
- Photograph of Alberto Errera from the collection of the Jewish Museum of Greece
- Born: 15 January 1913; Thessaloniki, Kingdom of Greece
- Died: August 1944 (aged 31); Auschwitz-Birkenau, Nazi Germany
- Military career
- Allegiance: (Greece) Kingdom of Greece; National Liberation Front
- Branch: Hellenic Army; ELAS
- Rank: Captain
- Conflicts: World War II: Battle of Greece; Greco-Italian War; Greek Resistance; Sonderkommando revolt

Alberto Israel Errera (Greek: Αλβέρτος Ερρέρα, 15 January 1913 – August 1944) was a Greek-Jewish officer and a member of the anti-Nazi resistance. He was a member of the Sonderkommando in Auschwitz-Birkenau from May to August 1944.

He took part in the preparation of the Sonderkommando revolt of 1944. He is one of the possible authors of the Sonderkommando photographs. Errera died in Auschwitz-Birkenau.

== Biography ==
Errera was born in Thessaloniki. Before the war, he was a soldier in the Hellenic Army, where he was promoted to officer and achieved the rank of captain. He married a woman called Matthildi from Larissa, where he settled and owned a supermarket. He joined the partisans and the Greek People's Liberation Army during the German occupation of Greece, working as a food supplier. He took the Christian name Alex (Alekos) Michaelides, or, according to his nephew, Alexandros Alexandris. On the night of 24 March 1944, he was arrested by the Germans in Larissa, in addition to a group of 225 Jews, and then jailed in the Haidari concentration camp. According to his nephew, he was captured, not as a Jew, but as a leftist. He was deported from Athens on 2 April and arrived at Auschwitz on 11 April, at which point he was one of the 320 Greeks (assigned serial numbers from 182,440 to 182,759) selected for labor. His number was 182,552. After spending two days in the Zentral Sauna in Birkenau, he and the other Greek men lived in the Block 12 of the Männerquarantäne Lager from April 13 to May 11. Then he was selected, along with 100 Greeks, to be part of the Sonderkommando. He was assigned the job of a Heizer ("stoker"), a member of the Sonderkommando assigned to the crematorium furnace, in Birkenau Krematorium V. Alter Fajnzylberg talks about his athletic build and Leon Cohen describes his unusual strength. According to Filip Müller, Leon Cohen, and the historian and fellow prisoner Hermann Langbein, Errera was among those who actively participated in the preparations for the Sonderkommando Uprising, alongside Yaacov Kaminski, Jankiel Handelsmann, Jukl Wrobel, Josef Warszawski, a man named Władek, Giuseppe Baruch and Zalman Gradowski, among others.

According to Izack Cohen, who worked in the Kanada Kommando, Errera was the leader of the Greek resistance group in Krematorium V. He tried to recruit Izack Cohen in the resistance group.

Through the testimony of Alter Fajnzylberg, it has been revealed that it was Errera who took the famous "Sonderkommando photographs" in the beginning of August 1944, with the help of Dawid Szmulewski, another member of the resistance, and three other members of the Sonderkommando, Szlama Dragon, his brother, and Alter Fajnzylberg, who kept watch. After taking the photographs, Errera buried the camera in the soil at the camp, for retrieval and discovery later.

On 9 August 1944, during the transport from the crematoria of ash that was to be discharged into the Vistula, Errera tried to convince his three co-detainees (including Hugo Baruch Venezia and Henri Nechama Capon) to escape, but they refused. Once on site, Errera stunned the accompanying two Schupos with a shovel and plunged into the Vistula. He was caught during the next two or three days, tortured and killed. As was usual when a fugitive was caught, Errera's body was exposed at the men's camp entrance (BIId) as an example to the other inmates.

Errera was awarded by the Greek government in the 1980s for his contribution in the Greek resistance during World War II.

== Sonderkommando photographs ==
For many years, the author of the Sonderkommando photographs was unknown. The photographs were credited as anonymous or, by default, assigned to Dawid Szmulewski, who himself mentioned a Greek Jew named Alex. The story of these photos was recorded in the writings of Alter Fajnzylberg, who evokes the figure of the Greek Jew named Alex (although he forgot the surname). In May 1978, Fajnzylberg answered a letter from the Auschwitz-Birkenau Museum, about the photographs. He wrote:

It was Alex from Greece, but I do not remember his name, who took the photographs. He died during an escape during the transport of ash from incinerated people. These ashes were regularly dumped in the Sola or in the Vistula. Alex disarmed both SS escort[s] and threw their rifles into the Vistula. He died during the pursuit. I do not remember where the camera and other documents were buried because it [was] Alex who performed this work.

However, in his diaries written immediately after the war, Fajnzylberg mentions the attempted escape of a Greek Jew named Aleko Errera. Errera's escape was also told by several surviving witnesses: Errikos Sevillias, Shlomo Venezia, Leon Cohen, Marcel Nadjary, Dr. Miklos Nyiszli, Alter Fajnzylberg, Henryk Mandelbaum, Albert Menasche, Daniel Bennahmias and Eddy de Wind.

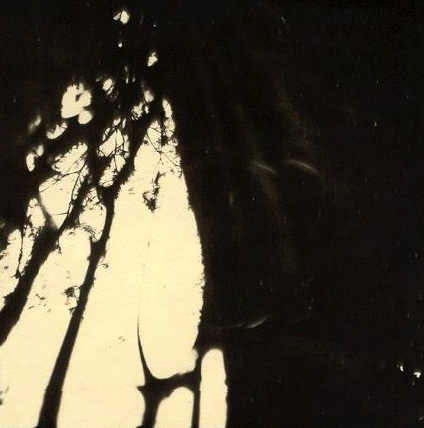
No. 283 Sonderkommando in Auschwitz-Birkenau, August 1944 (clandestine photo) Picture pointed too high

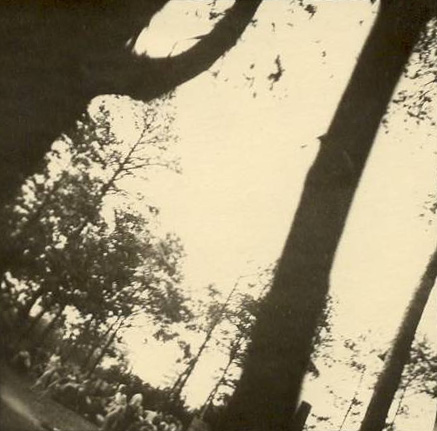
No 282 Sonderkommando in Auschwitz-Birkenau, August 1944 (clandestine photo) Women being undressed before going into Gas Chambers

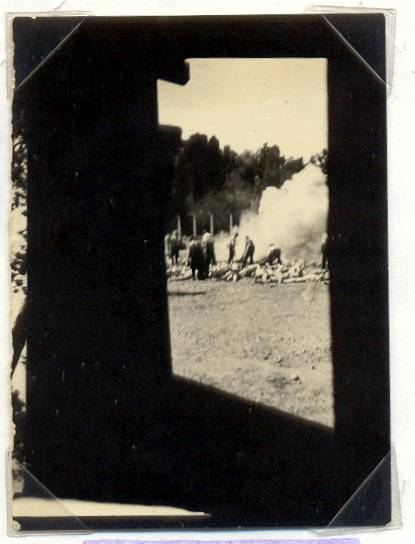
No 281 Sonderkommando in Auschwitz-Birkenau, August 1944 (clandestine photo) Burning of the dead bodies [part of 282 seen at left]

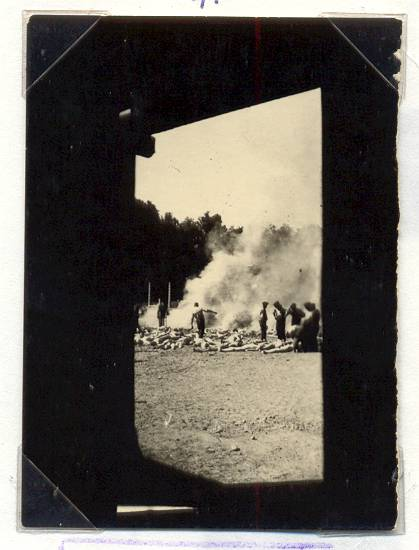
No 280 Sonderkommando in Auschwitz-Birkenau, August 1944 (clandestine photo) Burning of the dead bodies
