= Leon Cohen =

Greek Jewish Holocaust survivor

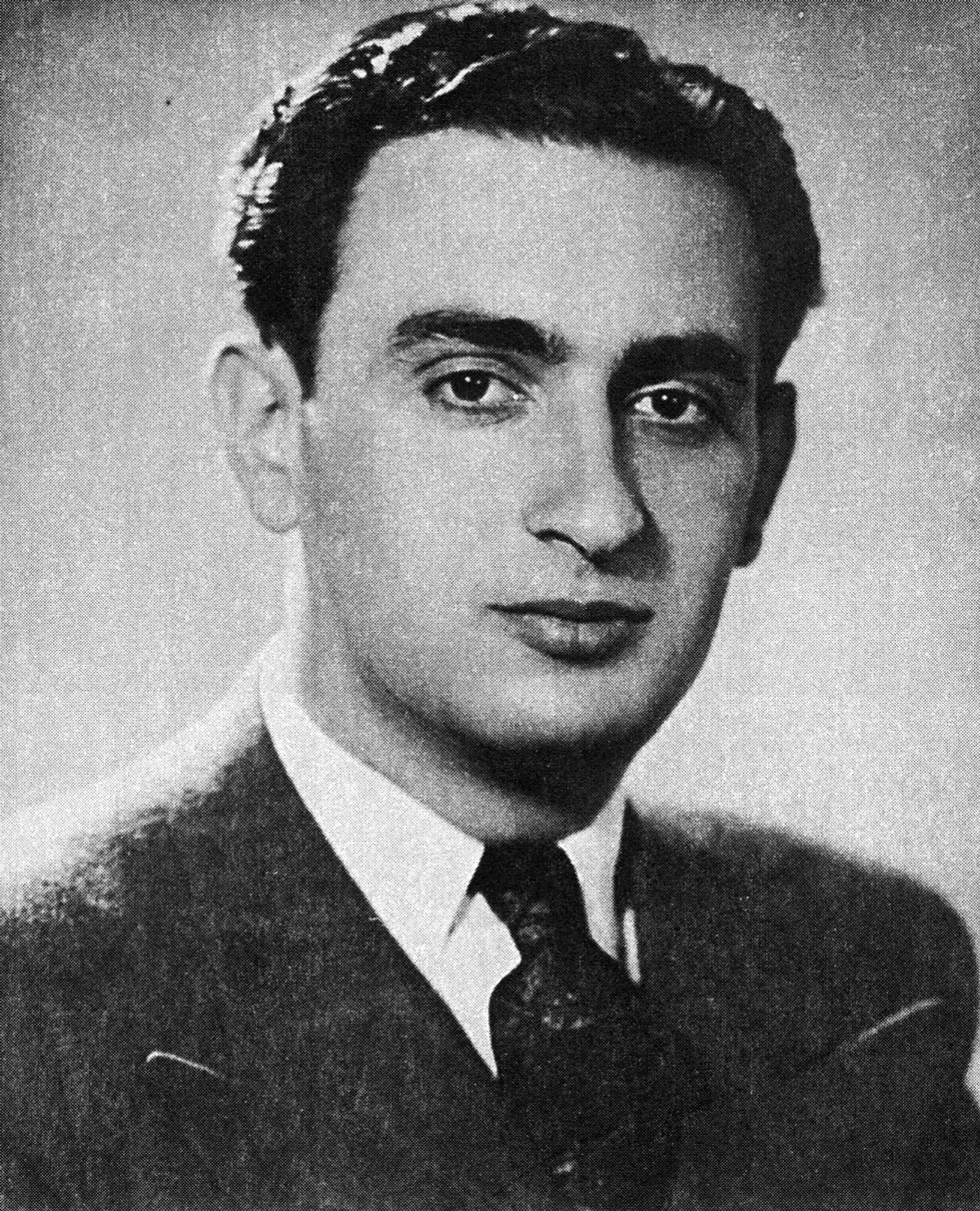
Leon Cohen

Leon Cohen (Greek: Λεών Κοέν; 15 January 1910 – August 1989), was a Greek Jewish survivor of the Auschwitz concentration camp. He was a member of the Sonderkommando in Birkenau from May to November 1944. He was one of the only three members of the Sonderkommando who wrote his memoirs after the war, along with Filip Müller and Marcel Nadjari. He took part in the preparation of the Sonderkommando uprising.

== Biography ==
The father of Leon Cohen was a well-off, successful merchant, who imported goods from Germany and Austria and had commercial relations with small merchants in Brussels. Leon Cohen had two sisters, Agnes and Margot, and one brother, Robert. He went to the Leon Gatenyo business school, a French-German institution. He was given a strong French education and learned the finest French literature, because the teacher was the principal and founder of the Chevalier de la Liaison Française school. After he graduated, he first worked at the Thessaloniki international fair. Later on, he worked for Decca Records, an enterprise that sold records and radio sets. Before the occupation, he was an official supplier for the Greek Ministry of Defense. Later on, he was drafted into the Greek army. He was arrested in 1942, like thousands of young Jewish men, and was sent to the German prison in Thessaloniki, from which he escaped. On January 15, 1943, he married his first wife, Germaine Perahia, the daughter of Yehoshua Perahia, owner of the Bank Union (along with Joseph Nehama) in Thessaloniki. The Jews of Thessaloniki were sent into a ghetto from which he escaped with his wife. He arrived in Athens and was arrested by the Germans, while his wife and her parents hid themselves. He was sent to the Haidari concentration camp.

=== Experiences in Auschwitz ===
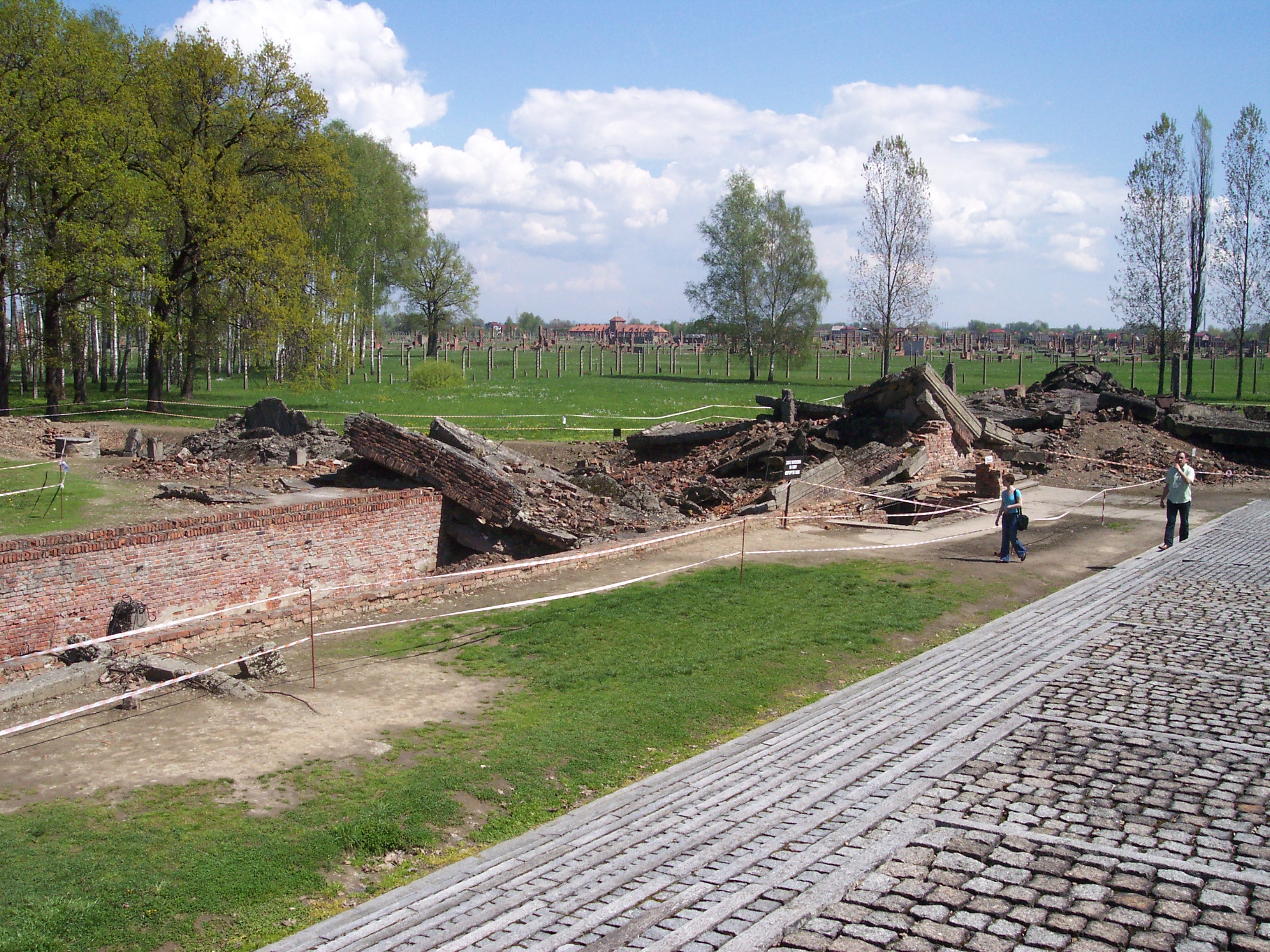
Ruin of Krematorium III in Birkenau

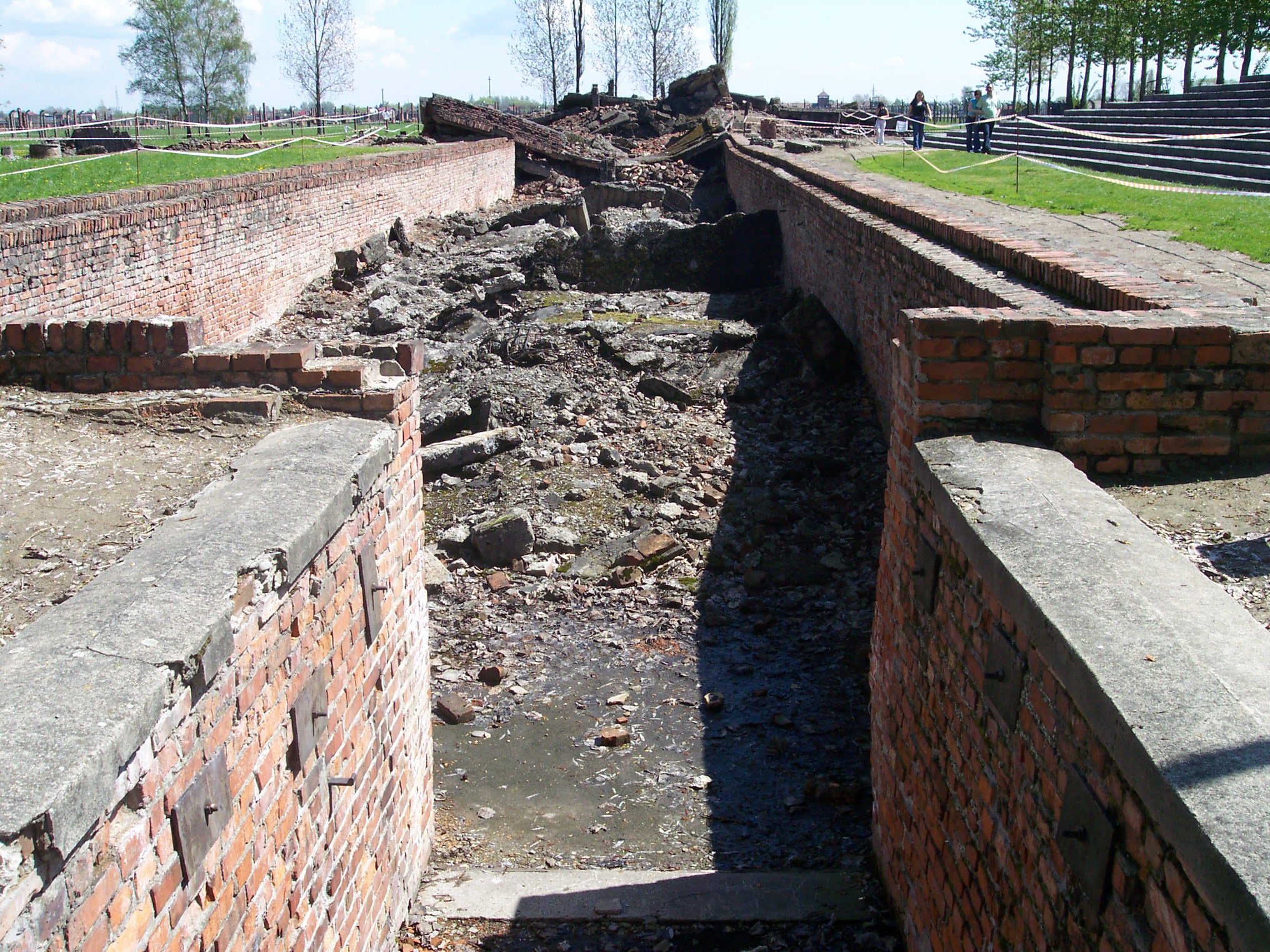
Entrance to Krematorium III in Birkenau

He was deported from Athens on April 2, 1944, and arrived at Auschwitz on April 11. His mother and his younger sister Margot, who was pregnant, were murdered upon their arrival. Cohen is one of the 320 Greek men selected for labor (serial numbers from 182440 to 182759). His number is 182492. As he could speak German, it was a vital asset, considering that most of the Sephardic Jews from Thessaloniki could only speak Greek, Ladino, Italian, or French. They were isolated in the camp most of the time, in particular with regards to the other Jews who were speaking mostly in Yiddish. After spending two days in the Zentral Sauna in Birkenau, he and the other Greek men lived in the Block 12 of the Männerquarantäne Lager from April 13 to May 11. Then he was selected, along with 100 Greeks, to be part of the Sonderkommando After a few days at the cremation pits of the Bunker 2 and at the Krematorium IV, he was permanently assigned to Krematorium III as "dentist" or Zähnekontrolle (i.e. examining the mouths of the people who have been murdered and ripping out their gold teeth). He witnessed the destruction of the Hungarian Jews during the summer of 1944, the definitive evacuation of the family camp (from 10 to 12 July) and the gassing of the Gypsies in the beginning of August. As with many witnesses, he remembered the cruelty of the Hauptscharführer Otto Moll. At the Krematorium III, he met the French painter David Olère and was very close with French industrialist Hersz Strasfogel. He took part in the preparation of the Sonderkommando uprising, alongside Yaacov Kaminski, Lemke Chaïm Pliszko, Dawid Kotchak, Giuseppe Baruch, Leibl Paul Katz, Marcel Nadjari and Alberto Errera. But when it happened on October 7, 1944, the prisoners of the Krematorium III could not take part in the rebellion and were quickly surrounded by the Germans. After the end of the extermination by gas in mid-November, Cohen and his comrades were drafted into the Abbruchkommando Krematorium, which means the unit in charge of the demolition of the Krematoriums (about 70 prisoners). On January 18, 1945, the SS begun to evacuate Auschwitz, and the few thousand inmates that could walk were filed out of the camp on a death march. Although the members of the Sonderkommando were not allowed to leave the camp, Cohen and other members of the Sonderkommando mingled with the crowd of prisoners (about a hundred members of the Sonderkommando escaped from the camp that way). He was sent to the Mauthausen concentration camp. He was deported to Melk, Linz, Gusen and Ebensee concentration camps from which he was liberated on May 5, 1945 by the 80th Infantry Division of the US Army. Almost dead, he was treated in hospital (between 40 and 50 former members of the Sonderkommando survived after the camps were freed).

=== After Auschwitz ===
He went back to Thessaloniki in August 1945. He had two children, Lily and Jean-Jose.
In 1946, he met in Paris the daughter of Herzs Strasfogel, a member of the Sonderkommando who became a close friend and was killed during a Selektion in November 1944 by the Germans and to which he had promised to visit his family if he survived.
In 1972, he settled in Israel in Bat Yam with his second wife. He was interviewed three times by Israeli Historian Gideon Greif and wrote a book in French : From Greece to Birkenau, the crematoria workers' uprising. He received no reparations from Germany, evidently due to bureaucratic foot dragging or negligence. His health deteriorated and he died in 1989 in Bat Yam. Select excerpts of his book appeared in Hebrew in the journal Pe'amim in 1986 and an English edition of the memoirs came out in 1996. Unfortunately, the original manuscript in French is lost and this publishing lacks the beginning in Greece and the end in Mauthausen. Leon Cohen is mentioned by numerous survivors: Ya'akov Gabai, Shaul Chazan, Shlomo Dragon, Jozef Sackar, Marcel Nadjari, Daniel Bennhamias, Jacques Stroumsa and Shlomo Venezia.
