= From Where They Stood =

2021 Holocaust documentary

From Where They Stood, also known as À pas aveugles, is a 2021 Holocaust documentary by French documentarian Christophe Cognet that scrutinizes photographs taken clandestinely by prisoners at the Dachau, Auschwitz, Mittlelbau-Dora and Buchenwald Nazi concentration camps during World War II. The photographs were smuggled out of the camps and developed during the war or afterwards.

== Production ==
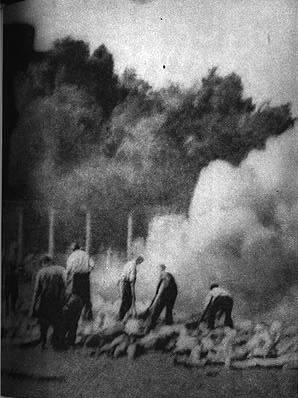
Cropped photo of bodies being burned at Auschwitz, which was analyzed in the film

Unlike other Holocaust documentaries, which rely on survivor testimonials, Cognet chose to take an investigative approach. He scrutinized closely each of the photographs to determine precisely where they were taken. The film begins by showing photographs taken secretly by a prisoner at Dachau who worked as a nurse at the prisoner infirmary. These show the barracks and portraits of prisoners, sometimes posing casually.

The photographs differ from pictures of the camps taken during the war by German photographers for propaganda purposes, and photos taken just after liberation by Allied forces. These were photos taken by prisoners of prisoners, at great personal risk. The photographers included prisoners Rudolf Cisar at Dachau, Georges Angeli at Buchenwald, and Alberto Errera at Auschwitz. Some of the photographers and subjects were members of resistance movements at the camps.

Some of the pictures show women prisoners who had been subjected to medical experiments, and the photographs shown the injuries caused to their legs by Nazi "doctors". In one procedure, gangrene was injected into an open wound.

The film concludes with a detailed examination of the photographs made adjacent to a gas chamber at Auschwitz. The photographs show nude women preparing to be led to the gas chamber, and other photographs taken subsequent to the gassing, showing bodies piled up for cremation in open pits.

The film begins and ends with a depiction of a pond where cremated remains had been disposed, showing bone fragments that become evident many decades later after heavy rainfalls.

The film had its U.S. premiere at the 2022 New York Jewish Film Festival at Lincoln Center, with a North American theatrical release in July 2022.

== Critical reaction ==
The Forward called it "an extraordinary, wholly unfamiliar, unprecedented film." The New York Times said the "film can feel overly cerebral—a bit like being plunged into a seminar—and the text cards do a lot of explanatory heavy lifting. But Cognet’s forensic approach does insist on memorializing these events in an important, physically specific way and, intentionally or not, queasily anticipates a world without any living eyewitnesses to these horrors."

== Accolades ==
From Where They Stood won the Spirit of Freedom Award for best documentary at the 2021 Jerusalem Film Festival.

== See also ==
- Photography of the Holocaust
- Sonderkommando photographs
