= Sonderkommando photographs =

1944 photographs of Auschwitz concentration camp

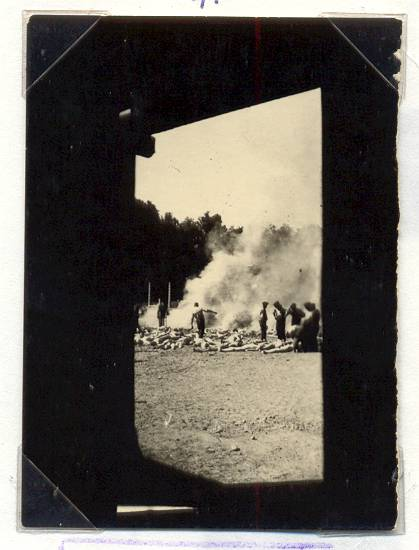
No. 280, framed by the gas chamber's doorway or window

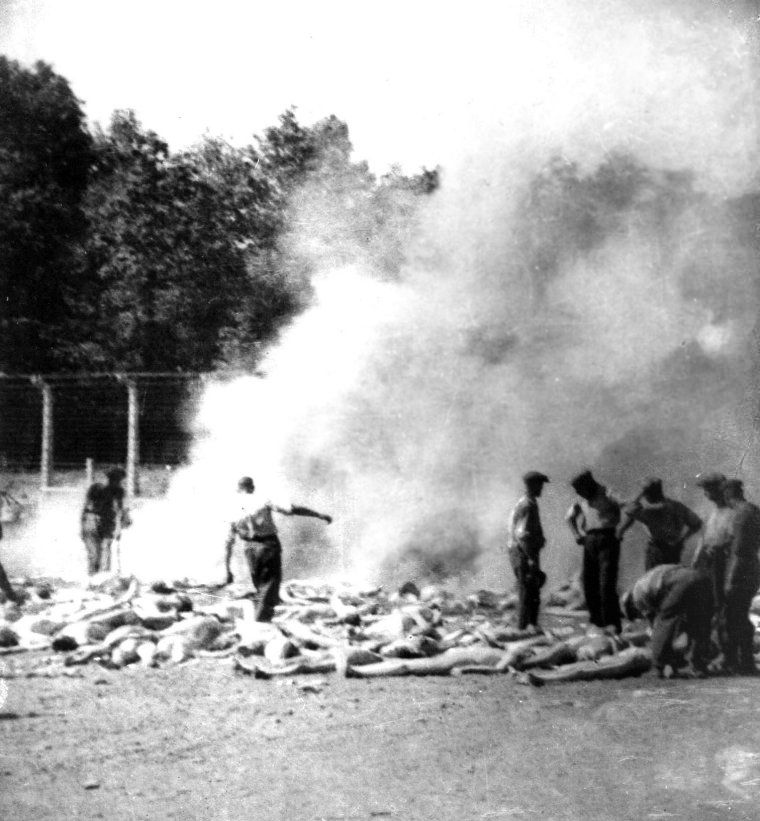
No. 280 cropped

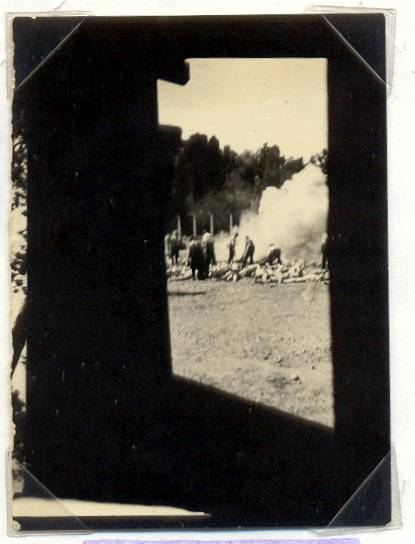
No. 281

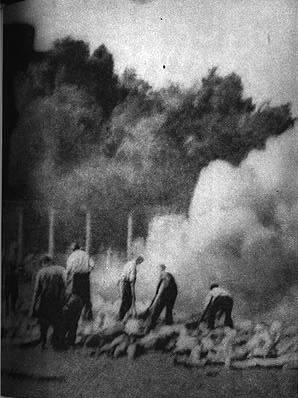
No. 281 cropped and retouched

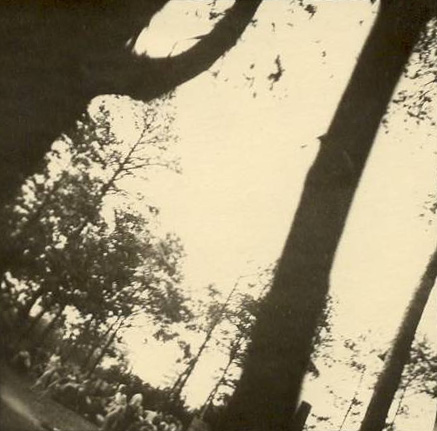
No. 282: women being taken to the gas chamber

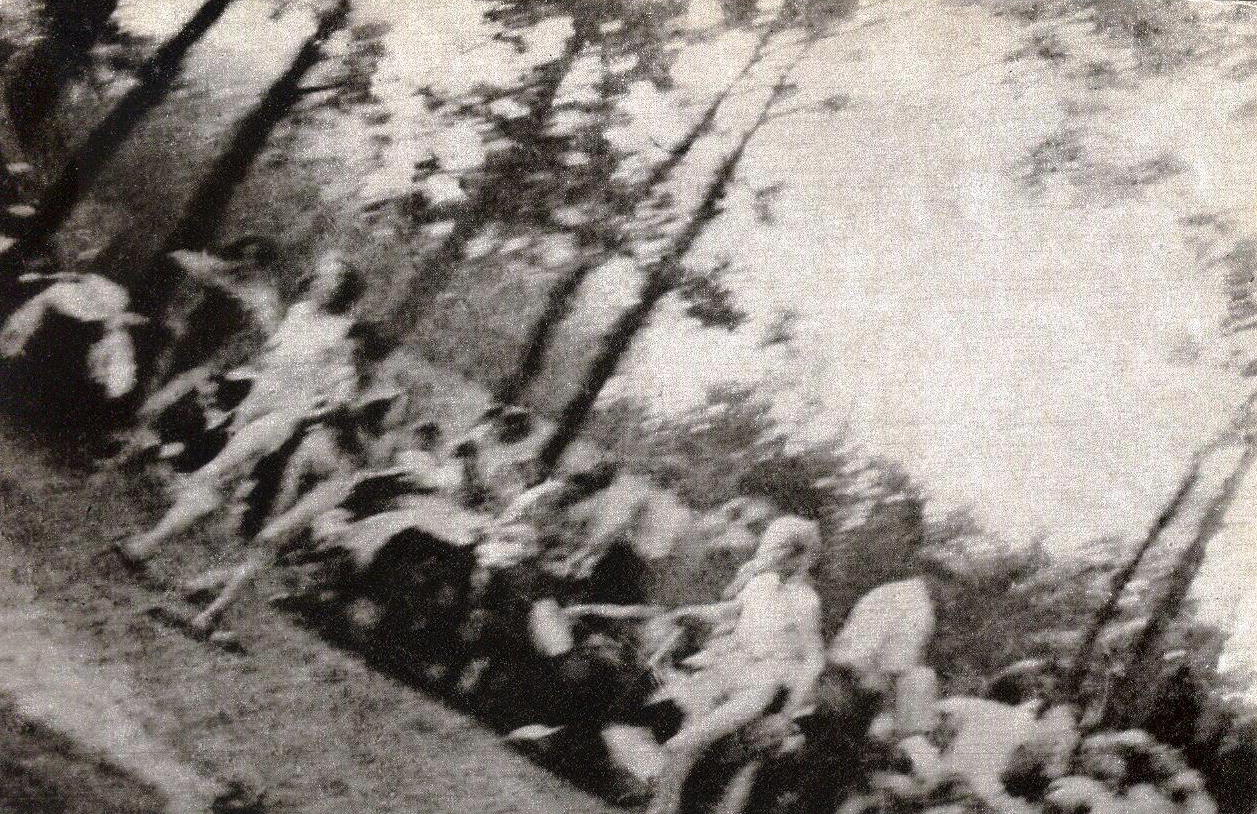
No. 282 cropped

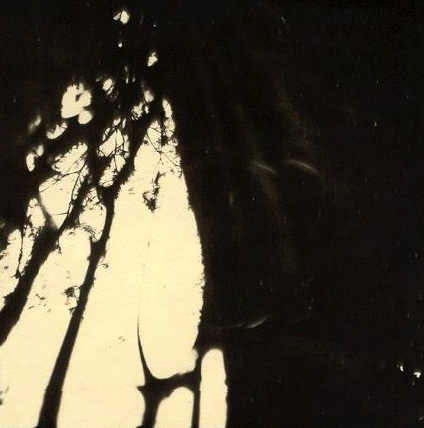
No. 283: Trees near the gas chamber, taken shortly after No. 282. The photographer, shooting from the hip, aimed the camera too high

The Sonderkommando photographs are four blurred photographs taken secretly in August 1944 inside the Auschwitz concentration camp in German-occupied Poland. Along with a few photographs in the Auschwitz Album, they are the only ones known to exist of events around the gas chambers. (Note: Franziska Reiniger, Yad Vashem: "Among the millions of photographs that are related to Nazi death camps, only four depict the actual process of mass killing perpetrated at the gas chambers in Auschwitz-Birkenau.")

The images were taken within 15–30 minutes of each other by an inmate inside Auschwitz-Birkenau, the extermination camp within the Auschwitz complex. Usually named only as Alex, a Jewish prisoner from Greece, the photographer was a member of the Sonderkommando, inmates forced to work in and around the gas chambers. (Note: Georges Didi-Huberman (2008): "Hidden at the bottom of a bucket, the camera got into the hands of a Greek Jew called Alex, still unidentified today, for we do not know his family name. He was positioned on the lower level, in front of the incineration pits, where he was supposed to work with the other members of the squad.") Several sources identified him as Alberto Errera, a Greek military officer. He took two shots from inside one of the gas chambers and two outside, shooting from the hip, unable to aim the camera with any precision. The Polish resistance smuggled the film out of the camp in a toothpaste tube.

The photographs were numbered 280–283 by the Auschwitz-Birkenau State Museum. Nos. 280 and 281 show the cremation of corpses in a fire pit, shot through the black frame of the gas chamber's doorway or window. No. 282 shows a group of naked women just before they enter the gas chamber. No. 283 is an image of trees, the result of the photographer aiming too high.

== Sonderkommando ==
The Sonderkommando ("special unit") in Auschwitz were primarily made up of Jewish inmates, and at one point a few Soviet prisoners-of-war, who were forced to work in the crematoria. The crematoria contained the Entkleidungskammer (undressing rooms), gas chambers and furnaces. In the summer of 1944, the camp had up to 1,000 Sonderkommando working in four crematoria (nos. II–V), and a bunker with extra gas chambers, housed in a thatched brick building known as the "little white house".

After inmates had been "selected" as unfit for work by the SS, the Sonderkommando usually took them to the undressing room, then walked them to the gas chamber, telling them they were being taken to the bathing and disinfection room. To avoid panic, inmates were given a numbered hook for their belongings in the undressing room to make them believe they would be returning.

Afterwards, the Sonderkommando moved the bodies out of the gas chamber, removed gold fillings, false teeth, hair, jewellery and spectacles, and disposed of the corpses, at first in mass graves, and later in furnaces and fire pits. They then cleaned the gas chamber for the next arrivals.

== Taking the photographs ==
The photographer is usually named only as Alex, a Jewish inmate from Greece. Several sources have identified him as Alberto Errera, a Greek military officer who was shot and killed after striking an SS officer. Errera's code name was Alekos Alexandridis. Other members of the Sonderkommando in the camp's crematorium V—Alter Fajnzylberg (also known as Stanisław Jankowski), brothers Shlomo and Josel Dragon, and David Szmulewski—helped obtain and hide the camera, and acted as look-outs. Fajnzylberg, who had worked at crematorium V since July 1943, described how the photographs came to be taken:

On the day on which the pictures were taken ... we allocated tasks. Some of us were to guard the person taking the pictures. In other words, we were to keep a careful watch for the approach of anyone who did not know the secret, and above all for any SS men moving about in the area. At last the moment came. We all gathered at the western entrance leading from the outside to the gas-chamber of Crematorium V: we could not see any SS men in the watchtower overlooking the door from the barbed wire, nor near the place where the pictures were to be taken. Alex, the Greek Jew, quickly took out his camera, pointed it towards a heap of burning bodies, and pressed the shutter. This is why the photograph shows prisoners from the Sonderkommando working at the heap. One of the SS was standing beside them, but his back was turned towards the crematorium building. Another picture was taken from the other side of the building, where women and men were undressing among the trees. They were from a transport that was to be murdered in the gas-chamber of Crematorium V.

Fajnzylberg recalled that the camera looked like a German Leica. Szmulewski had hidden it in a bucket, and stayed on the roof of the crematorium as a look-out while Alex shot the film. Fajnzylberg stressed that, although Alex had pressed the shutter, all five men had been present and had acted together. According to Szmulewski, speaking in 1987 to Jean-Claude Pressac, the four photographs were taken within 15–30 minutes of each other. But according to director Christophe Cognet, the shorter shadows of the deportees in the birch woods, located to the south-east of the shooting, and the light of August indicate that photos 283 and 282 were taken between 10:00 and 11:30. The direction of the shadows in photos 280 and 281 of the cremation pits, taken in the West-South-West in relation to the shooting, and the August light, indicate that these photos were taken between 15:00 and 16:00. This suggests that it is the same transport photographed before and after the same gassing. Taking into account the position of the trees in photo 282 compared to the aerial photos, and considering the testimony of Alter Fajnzylberg, who reports that this photo, as well as photo 283, was taken from the inside, the historian Igor Bartosik put forward the hypothesis that these photos were taken through the opening for pouring Zyklon B into the gas chamber, located at a height of two metres, given the large size of Errera.

The black frame of the gas chamber's window, or probably doorway, is visible in photographs 280 and 281. In photograph 281, a fragment of photograph 282 can be seen on the left, which means that the order in which the images were taken contradicts the numbering of the State Museum: the images of undressing in the birch woods precede the images of the cremation pits.

The film was smuggled out of the camp by the Polish underground, hidden inside a tube of toothpaste by Helena Dantón, who worked in the SS canteen. A note dated 4 September 1944 and signed "Stakło", written by political prisoners Józef Cyrankiewicz and Stanisław Kłodziński, was attached to the film. It asked that the photographs be sent to "Tell", Teresa Łasocka-Estreicher of the underground in Kraków:

Urgent. Send two metal rolls of film for 6x9 as fast as possible. Have possibility of taking photos. Sending you photos of Birkenau showing prisoners sent to gas chambers. One photo shows one of the stakes at which bodies were burned when the crematoria could not manage to burn all the bodies. The bodies in the foreground are waiting to be thrown into the fire. Another picture shows one of the places in the forest where people undress before 'showering'—as they were told—and then go to the gas-chambers. Send film roll as fast as you can. Send the enclosed photos to Tell—we think enlargements of the photos can be sent further.

== Originals ==
When the photographs were first distributed by the Polish resistance, they were cropped to focus on the figures, with the black frames in the two fire-pit images removed. Photography historian Janina Struk writes that Teresa Łasocka-Estreicher ("Tell" in the note from the camp) asked Polish photographer Stanisław Mucha to make prints, and it is assumed that it was Mucha who decided to crop them.

Some of the cropped images were published in 1945, attributed to the Sonderkommando member David Szmulewski, in a report on Auschwitz-Birkenau by Jan Sehn, a Polish judge. One was exhibited at Auschwitz in 1947, and others were published in 1958 in Warsaw in a book by Stanisław Wrzos-Glinka, Tadeusz Mazur and Jerzy Tomaszewski, 1939–1945: Cierpienie i walka narodu polskiego (published in English as 1939–1945: We Have Not Forgotten). Some of the figures had been retouched to make them clearer.

Struk writes that, in 1960, Władyslaw Pytlik of the resistance movement in Brzeszcze offered testimony about his wartime experiences to the Auschwitz-Birkenau State Museum, and brought along three prints of the cropped photographs. It was only in 1985, after Pytlik died and his wife donated his photographs to the museum, including the uncropped versions, that the museum realized the prints they had seen before had been cropped.

Commentators have argued that the cropping offers a distorted view of events, giving the impression that the photographer was able to use his camera openly. In fact, he and the rest of the group placed themselves in great danger by taking the shots; in two of them, 282 and 283, it is clear that he was not even able to look through the lens. The art historian Georges Didi-Huberman argues that the cropping makes the photographs appear safe and erases the act of resistance and the phenomenology of the images, the process that "made them an event":

The mass of black that surrounds the sight of the cadavers and the pits, this mass where nothing is visible gives in reality a visual mark that is just as valuable as all the rest of the exposed surface. That mass where nothing is visible is the space of the gas chamber: the dark room into which one had to retreat, to step back, in order to give light to the work of the Sonderkommando outside, above the pyres. That mass of black gives us the situation itself, the space of possibility, the condition of existence of the photographs themselves.

== In popular culture ==
- In 2014, Gerhard Richter transferred the photographs onto four canvases – one for each photo – and painted over them to create his cycle of paintings titled Birkenau.
- The photographs were referred to in the 2015 Hungarian film Son of Saul, and were analyzed in the 2021 French documentary From Where They Stood.

== See also ==
- Photography of the Holocaust
- Höcker Album, a collection of photographs with SS who ran the Auschwitz-Birkenau concentration camp
- Wilhelm Brasse, prisoner and photographer at Auschwitz
- Auschwitz Album, photos taken by SS photographers during the selection process
