= Nadjari =

Nadjari is a surname. Notable people with the surname include:

- Marcel Nadjari (1917–1971), Jewish-Greek Auschwitz concentration camp survivor
- Orral Nadjari (fl. 2019–2023), Swedish investment banker
- Raphaël Nadjari (born 1971), French-Israeli writer, and film and television director
