= Survivor guilt =

Mental condition

Survivor guilt or survivor's guilt (also survivor syndrome, survivor's syndrome, survivor disorder and survivor's disorder) happens when individuals feel guilty after they survive a tragic, near death, or traumatic event when others perished. It can cause similar depressive symptoms associated with PTSD. Dr. William G. Niederland first introduced the term to describe the feeling of punishment many of the Holocaust survivors felt for surviving over their loved ones. The experience and manifestation of survivor guilt will depend on an individual's psychological profile. When the Diagnostic and Statistical Manual of Mental Disorders IV (DSM-IV) was published, survivor guilt was removed as a recognized specific diagnosis, and redefined as a significant symptom of post-traumatic stress disorder (PTSD). The history of survivor guilt outlines similar symptoms among many groups and individuals that experience tragic situations. Other patterns of guilt are found in medical aid groups who lose patients and place blame on themselves. Examples of traumatic events include situations when an individual experiences intense feelings of guilt after a loved one has passed. War and the loss of a loved one due to traumatic events are closely related to feelings of depression and anxiety, that can later lead to PTSD. Suicidal thoughts are related to intense feelings of anxiety and depression from guilt related to traumatic events.

== Post-traumatic stress disorder (PTSD) ==
People that have a lasting fear or other mental health issues after traumatizing events may be experiencing post-traumatic stress disorder. Almost all people experience some type of traumatic event throughout their lifetime, and a percentage (5.6%) will be diagnosed with PTSD. Symptoms include: unwillingly reliving a traumatic event, avoiding situations that are a reminder of the event, feelings of intense distress that affects everyday activities, feeling of fear and horror when there is no threat, etc. An individual whose everyday activities are hindered due to recalling a traumatic event may be experiencing PTSD.

== History ==
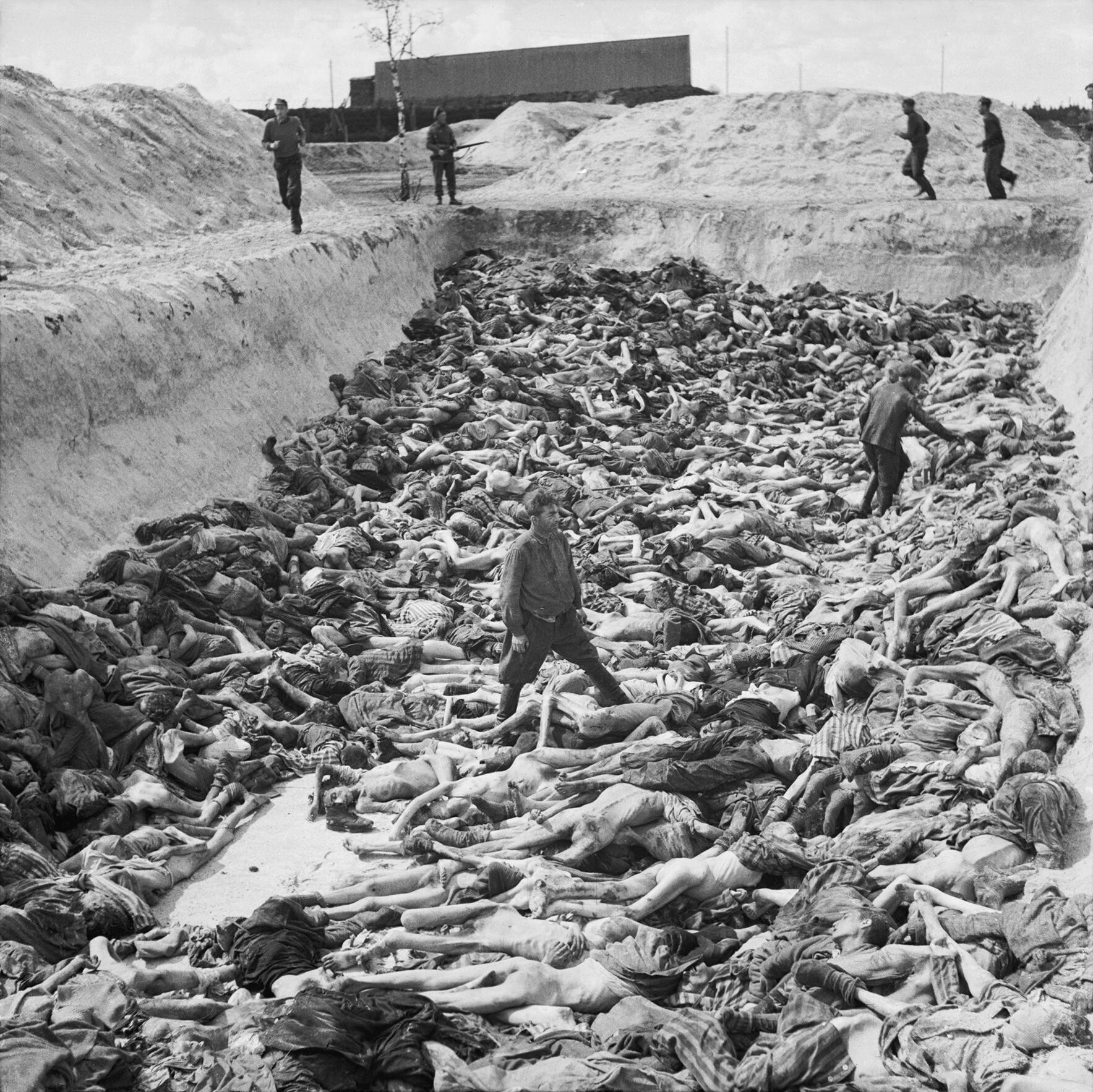
A mass grave in a concentration camp from the Holocaust. Survivors of such traumatic events may experience feelings of guilt or wonder whether they deserved to survive.

Survivor guilt was first identified during the 1960s. Several therapists recognized similar if not identical conditions among Holocaust survivors. Similar signs and symptoms have been recognized in survivors of traumatic situations including combat, natural disasters, terrorist attacks, air-crashes and wide-ranging job layoffs. A variant form has been found among rescue and emergency services personnel who blame themselves for doing too little to help those in danger, and among therapists, who may feel a form of guilt in the face of their patients' suffering.

Stephen Joseph, a psychologist at the University of Warwick, has studied the survivors of the capsizing of the Herald of Free Enterprise which killed 193 of the 459 passengers. His studies showed that 60 percent of the survivors suffered from survivor guilt. Joseph went on to say:

There were three types:

- first, there was guilt about staying alive while others died;
- second, there was guilt about the things they failed to do – these people often suffered post-traumatic 'intrusions' as they relived the event again and again;
- third, there were feelings of guilt about what they did do, such as scrambling over others to escape. These people usually wanted to avoid thinking about the catastrophe. They didn't want to be reminded of what really happened.

Sufferers sometimes blame themselves for the deaths of others, including those who died while rescuing the survivor or whom the survivor tried unsuccessfully to save.

=== Survivor syndrome ===
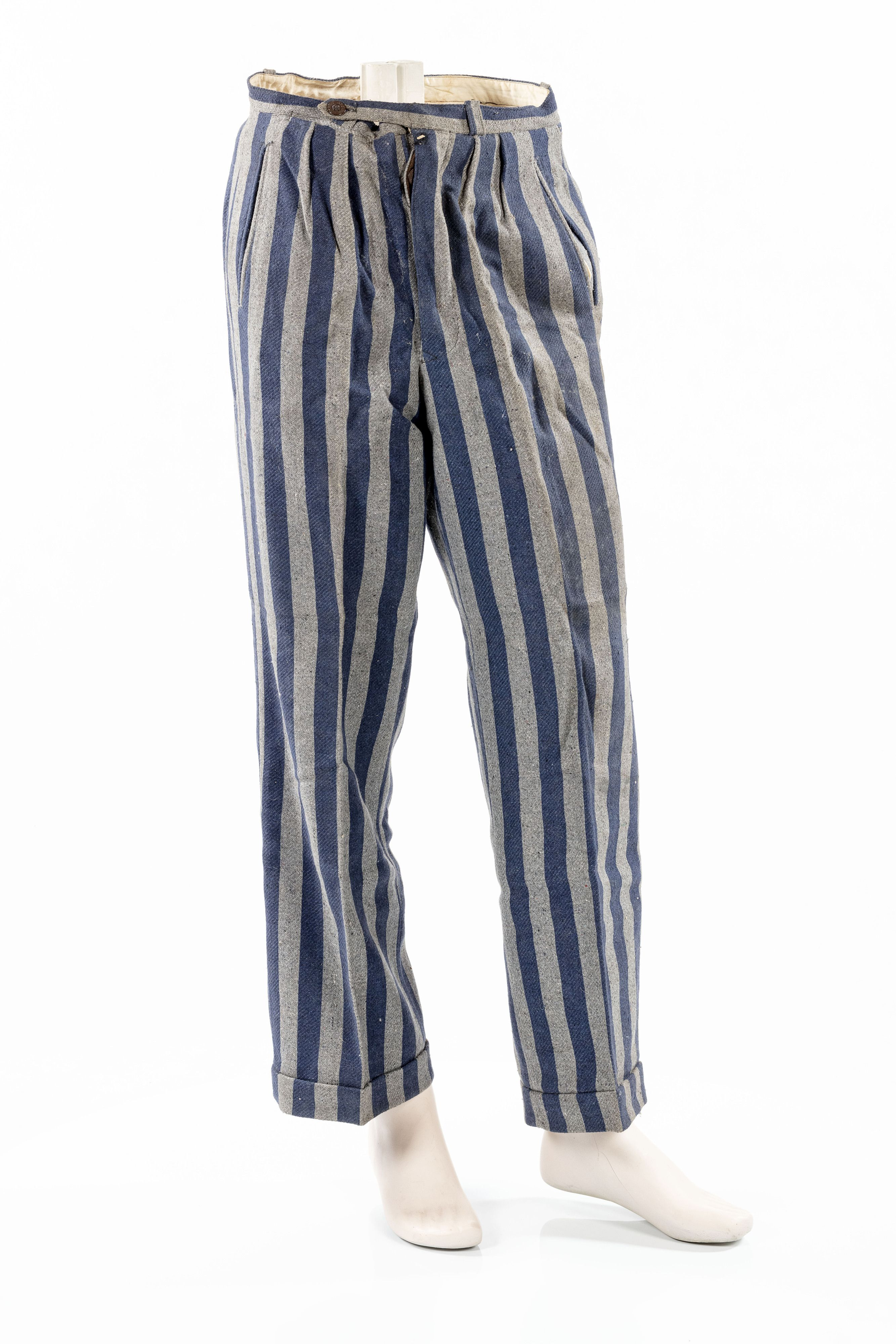
Trousers from a concentration camp uniform owned by Shimson Kleuger, interned in three KZ camps. Kleuger increasingly isolated himself in the family mansion, likely as a result of trauma left by the experiences of the Holocaust.

Survivor syndrome, also known as concentration camp syndrome (or KZ syndrome on account of the German term Konzentrationslager), are terms which have been used to describe the reactions and behaviors of people who have survived massive and adverse events, such as the Holocaust, or the Rape of Nanjing.

In 1949, Eddy de Wind, a Dutch psychiatrist and survivor of Auschwitz concentration camp, introduced the term "concentration camp syndrome" regarding the psychological consequences of persecution, describing the "pathological after-effects" unique to former prisoners of Nazi concentration and extermination camps. The subsequently well-documented syndrome among Holocaust survivors includes anxiety and depression, intellectual impairment, social withdrawal, sleep disturbance and nightmares, physical complaints and mood swings with loss of drive. Several studies have examined the "chronic and progressive" nature of the condition, with symptoms increasing in intensity as survivors age.

Commonly such survivors feel guilty that they have survived the trauma and others – such as their family, friends, and colleagues – did not.

Both conditions, along with other descriptive syndromes covering a range of traumatic events are now subsumed under post-traumatic stress disorder.

==== AIDS survivor syndrome ====
AIDS survivor syndrome refers to the psychological effects of living with the long-term trajectory of the AIDS epidemic and includes survivor guilt, depression, and feelings of being forgotten in contemporary discussions concerning HIV. While AIDS survivor syndrome has not been recognized as a pathologizable illness by the NIH (as of December 2017), scientific research and publications are available that address this issue.

== Examples ==
=== Waylon Jennings ===
American musician Waylon Jennings was a bassist for Buddy Holly's band and initially had a seat on the ill-fated aircraft on February 3, 1959, which would later come to be widely known as "the day the music died". Jennings, however, gave up his seat to the sick Jiles Perry Richardson Jr., known professionally as The Big Bopper. Jennings learned of the plane's crash on the band's tour bus the next morning just after waking up. The night before, when Holly learned that Jennings was not going to fly, he said, "Well, I hope your ol' bus freezes up." as their bus had repeatedly frozen up in the prior weeks. Jennings then responded, "Well, I hope your ol' plane crashes." This exchange of words, though made in jest at the time, haunted Jennings for the rest of his life.

=== Stoneman Douglas High School shooting ===
On February 14, 2018, Nikolas Cruz went into Marjory Stoneman Douglas High School in Parkland, Florida, and shot randomly at students and staff, killing 17 people and injuring 17 others. Sydney Aiello, whose close friend was killed, struggled with survivor guilt, and was later diagnosed with post-traumatic stress disorder. On March 17, 2019, Aiello died by suicide at the age of 19. Less than a week later, on March 23, Coral Springs police announced that Calvin Desir, a juvenile male student from Stoneman Douglas, had been found dead as a result of an apparent suicide.

=== Stephen Whittle ===
Stephen Whittle was a Liverpool F.C. fan who had bought a ticket for the FA Cup semi-final between Liverpool and Nottingham Forest F.C. on 15 April 1989, but sold his ticket to a friend due to work obligations that had prevented him from attending the match. Whittle's friend (whom he and his family have chosen to leave unidentified) was one of the 97 victims of the crowd crush at that game. After the event, Whittle became withdrawn from friends and family, stated he felt unable to go to football matches due to his guilt and related feeling of responsibility for his friend's death. He committed suicide on 26 February 2011, almost 22 years after the ill-fated match.

=== Charles Causley ===
British poet, broadcaster and teacher Charles Causley (1917–2003) served at sea and on land in the Royal Navy for most of the Second World War. Afterwards, he trained and worked as a teacher in Launceston, Cornwall, and (in his spare time and after retiring) wrote hundreds of poems for adults and children, between 1951 and 2000. One strong theme running through his work is his own sense of survivor guilt – a feeling in part triggered by the death of a friend who left Launceston for the war on the same train in 1940, but was later lost in action in the North Sea. For instance, Causley tells of how, when walking through the town centre years later, he would cross the road in order to avoid coming face-to-face with that friend's mother.

=== Columbine High School massacre ===
Several of the students and staff who survived the in April 1999 have experienced survivor guilt, including students Austin Eubanks, Anne Marie Hochhalter, Brooks Brown, and Richard Castaldo, among others. Principal Frank DeAngelis wrote in his 2019 memoir They Call Me Mr. De about the struggles with survivor guilt and PTSD, which caused him to suffer from heart disease and other mental health problems.

On May 6, 2000, 17-year-old student and survivor Greg Barnes committed suicide by hanging. He had seen teacher Dave Sanders when Sanders was shot by the gunmen.

== See also ==
- Impostor syndrome
- Miklos Kanitz
- Post-traumatic stress disorder
- Stockholm syndrome
- Survivors' Staircase
- Survivorship bias
