= Auschwitz Sonderkommando revolt =

1944 uprising by Nazi death camp workers

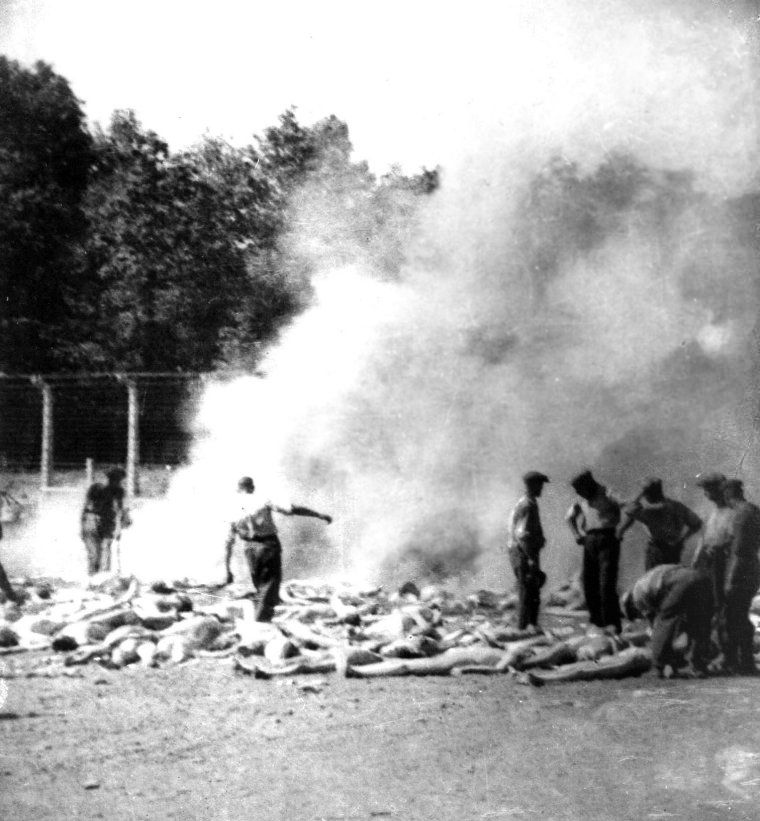
Sonderkommando photograph in Auschwitz-Birkenau (secretly taken by Alberto Errera in August 1944)

The Auschwitz Sonderkommando revolt occurred on 7 October 1944, when a large group of Sonderkommando members in the crematoria area of Birkenau (also known as Auschwitz II) rebelled against the SS guards of the camp. The revolt was suppressed after Crematorium IV was blown up, killing three guards and 452 members of the Sonderkommando.

== Background ==
The Birkenau camp (Auschwitz II) was the largest extermination facility built by the Nazis during World War II, where over a million people (mostly Jews) were murdered. The construction of the camp was completed in March 1942 and covered an area of about 5 square kilometres (1.9 sq mi), enclosed by a four-metre-high (13 ft) fence. Immediately after the construction was completed, the mass murder process began. Each day, 2,000 people were exterminated in two gas chambers, and the bodies were buried in mass graves. In September 1942, as part of Operation 1005, Jews were forced to exhume over 100,000 bodies from the mass graves and burn them.

Between March and June 1943, four gas chambers and crematoria were built on the west side of the camp (Crematoria II to V), allowing for the murder and burning of about 4,000 people per day.

Parallel to the mass murder activities, thousands of prisoners lived in Birkenau, forced to work in industrial factories in the Auschwitz-Birkenau area.

=== Sonderkommando ===
The gas chamber killings, body burning, and handling of the victims' belongings required a significant workforce. For this purpose, the Germans recruited about 1,000 Jews, called the Sonderkommando ('special work unit'), some of whom came from Greece. These Jews lived in separate buildings from the rest of the camp prisoners to prevent the spread of the truth about the murder industry. These workers received better living and food conditions; however, they were constantly threatened with death by the Germans, who routinely killed group members every few months and brought in new prisoners.

== Revolt ==
=== Organization ===
From the camp's early days, several resistance groups formed, primarily composed of prisoners who worked in medical and administrative roles and managed to survive longer. Initially, these resistance groups included only Polish prisoners and those of other nationalities, but Jews later joined them. In 1943, an overarching organization of the resistance in Auschwitz, called the Kampfgruppe Auschwitz (Auschwitz Combat Group) was formed. One of the groups under this organization was the Sonderkommando, working in the gas chambers and crematoria.

Kampfgruppe Auschwitz began planning a general revolt in the camp. Initially, the revolt was scheduled for June 1944, but it was postponed to August and later canceled.

=== Preparations for the revolt ===
In preparation for the general revolt, the Sonderkommando planned to blow up the crematoria to halt the murder operations. To obtain the necessary explosives, the prisoners contacted a group of women working in an explosives factory called "Weichsel Metall Union Werke". Roza Robota led this group, and the women began smuggling small amounts of explosives each day, hidden in double-bottomed food containers, to the liaison prisoners Jehuda Laufer, Israel Gutman, and Noah Zabludowicz. These three transferred the explosives to the resistance.

=== Revolt plan ===
The revolt planned by the Sonderkommando members was intended to be part of the general revolt planned by Kampfgruppe Auschwitz. However, following a reduction in the number of Jews being transported from Hungary, 300 members of the Sonderkommando were executed, and the remaining members realized that they too were likely to face a similar fate soon. They decided to initiate the revolt independently after failing to coordinate with the leadership of Kampfgruppe Auschwitz. Given the Germans' intention to reduce the group size by another 300 members, it was decided to start the revolt on 7 October 1944, at 16:00. The plan was to overpower the German soldiers during evening roll call, blow up the four crematoria, cut the electrified (only at night) fence, and escape.

=== Beginning of the revolt ===
On the day of the revolt, at 12:00, German soldiers unexpectedly arrived at Crematoria IV and V and began to isolate a group of prisoners for deportation. Without coordination with their counterparts in Crematoria II and III, the prisoners in Crematoria IV and V began to resist the Germans using cold weapons and the few firearms they had. The Germans retreated and opened fire on the prisoners while simultaneously calling for reinforcements from the camp. The prisoners who had barricaded themselves inside the building set fire to Crematorium IV, and the fire reached the wooden roof, causing the building to collapse and also damaging Crematorium V. Reinforced German forces began shooting indiscriminately at the prisoners hiding in the crematoria, killing many of them.

The prisoners in Crematoria II and III, who had planned to join the revolt at 16:00, were taken by surprise by the events at Crematoria IV and V. The prisoners in Crematorium III decided not to join the revolt, understanding that the Germans were waiting outside the building to shoot them. However, the prisoners in Crematorium II exited the building, and using cold weapons and homemade grenades assembled with the obtained explosives, managed to make their way to the camp's wire fence, cut it, and escape. It is estimated that about 80 prisoners managed to flee.

=== Results of the revolt ===
Approximately 280 Sonderkommando members were killed in Crematoria IV and V, 171 in Crematorium III, and 1 in Crematorium II, bringing the total number of Sonderkommando members killed in the crematoria to 452. During the events, three German camp guards were also killed. There is no documentation of the names of most prisoners who were killed.

The fate of the prisoners from Crematorium II who escaped is unclear. They had to contend with broader security perimeters prepared by the Germans, and it is known that some were caught in a trap in a village near the camp, which the Germans set on fire and shot at escaping prisoners. According to researchers' information, 27 of the escapees managed to flee and survived the war.

After the revolt, the crematoria were not returned to operation, and they were blown up before the Germans left the camp.

== Memorialization ==
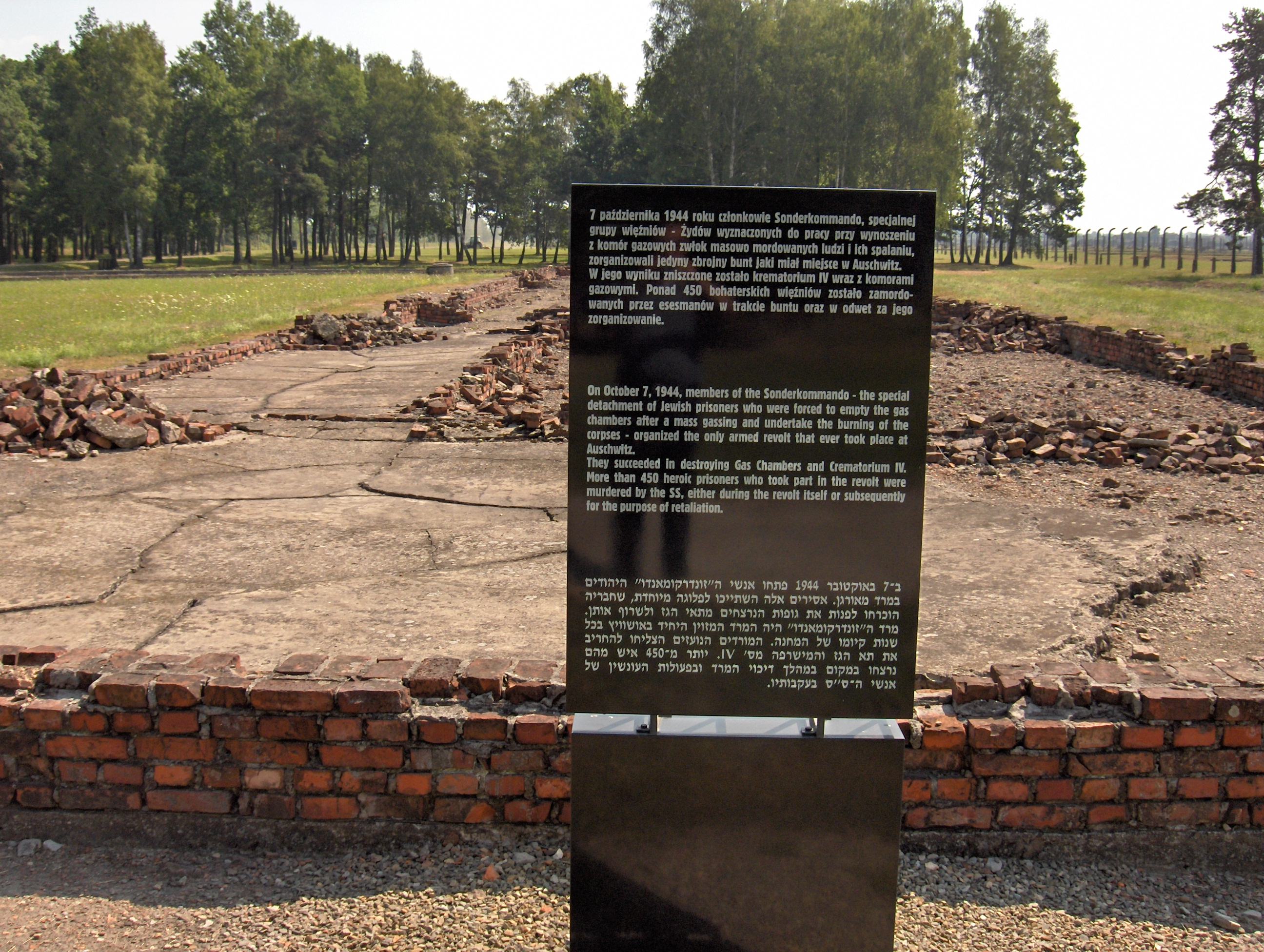
Memorial to the victims of the Sonderkommando revolt

A sign detailing the revolt's events was placed by the ruins of Crematorium IV.

- Gideon Greif wrote the book We Wept Without Tears – Testimonies of the Jewish Sonderkommando from Auschwitz, documenting, among other things, the revolt.
- Zalman Gradowski, who was murdered during the revolt, wrote diaries that were hidden and found after the war, which became the book In the Heart of Hell – Diary of a Prisoner and Leader of the Sonderkommando Revolt in Auschwitz, describing the events of the revolt.

== Arts ==
- 1985 – Claude Lanzmann's film Shoah included a comprehensive and in-depth interview with Filip Müller, a survivor of Auschwitz and a member of the Sonderkommando.
- 2001 – Tim Blake Nelson's film The Grey Zone was released, dealing with the Sonderkommando operating in Auschwitz and the revolt they staged in 1944. The film featured actors Harvey Keitel, David Arquette, and Mira Sorvino.
- 2015 – The Hungarian film Son of Saul was released, dealing with the same topic and combining the story of a Sonderkommando prisoner who encounters his son's body and does everything possible to provide a proper burial in the extermination camp. Gideon Greif's book inspired the film's director, László Nemes. Gideon Greif also served as a scientific advisor for the film.
- 2022 – A documentary film by Professor Greif and Itai Lev, with the same title, was released, featuring footage taken in 1993 (fifty years after the Holocaust) from a trip that Professor Greif took with survivors of the Sonderkommando to Auschwitz, where they shared their testimonies and memories.
