= Miklos Kanitz =

Hungarian Holocaust survivor

Miklos Samual Kanitz (1939 – November 9, 2006) was a Hungarian-Canadian Holocaust survivor living in Saskatoon, Saskatchewan. He narrowly escaped being transported to the German death camp at Auschwitz in June 1944 at the age of six, because a neighbor, whose son was a member of the Hungarian fascist Arrow Cross Party, risked her life to hide Kanitz, his mother, and his brother in her potato cellar for seven months until the end of the war.

In 1946, Kanitz's father became secretary of his local Communist Party and later still, deputy-minister of industry for Hungary. In his role as party secretary, his job was to oversee the post-war judicial system in his area. The neighbor who had saved his family appealed to him for the life of her own son, who was due to be hanged for his activities with the Arrow Cross Party. Kanitz's father refused to spare him, because, he said, "saving three Jews does not wash the blood off someone who has probably killed hundreds."

== Awaiting transport to Auschwitz ==
Kanitz was six years old and living in Budapest with his parents, Miklos and Tereza Kanitz, and his older brother, Gyula, when the Nazis invaded Hungary in March 1944. His father had already been taken to a labor camp when his mother, brother, and himself were told to pack small bags, and make their way with 500 other Jews to an abandoned brick factory outside Budapest, where they would soon be transported, they were told, to a "safer place," which Kanitz later learned was the Nazi death camp at Auschwitz in Poland. Between May 15 and July 9, 1944, 437,000 Jews were deported from Hungary, all but 15,000 of whom were murdered at Auschwitz-Birkenau.

The disused factory was a muddy field the size of a football pitch containing thousands of people, with no facilities of any kind and no shelter. Kanitz and his family spent two weeks there, waiting for the trucks to take them to the camp. "It was raining and we had absolutely no cover, no blankets, no shelter, nothing to sit or to lie down on. Just the mud," Kanitz said in an interview with The StarPhoenix. There was one barrel of water a day, and meals consisted of a cup of hot water with some rotting vegetables in it.

"All around, children were so afraid they were defecating. Babies were screaming. Soldiers were going around beating people for being 'pigs.' You're living in mud, and they call you a dirty goddamn Jew because you're covered in mud."

Every night, a group of Jews was made to gather up the bodies of those who had died during the day. Kanitz watched as people lost their minds, as old people died, and as children were killed. "There was this family about 10 feet away from us, a mother with four children, three boys and a little girl. She was a very cute little girl, maybe two years old, curly blonde hair. But she was sick and she was crying a lot, and one afternoon I saw this guard shouting to the mother to keep this dirty little Jew quiet. But she kept on crying, so he came over and he just smashed the little girl's head in with his rifle butt."

== Life in the cellar ==
After spending around two weeks in the field, the Kanitzs heard their names being called by one of the guards. When they walked to the gate, they saw that their neighbor, Mrs. Nagy, had asked a guard to release them. Kanitz assumes she said she needed them to use as labor.

She took them to her home for a bath and clean clothes, and then the family descended into Mrs. Nagy's potato cellar, where they were to spend the next seven months. The cellar measured eight by eight by five feet, built at the side of the house and mostly underground except for the top 18 inches, with no windows, just some light coming through wooden slats overhead.

The family had to be careful that Mrs. Nagy's son, János, did not notice their presence. János was a member of the Arrow Cross Party, the Hungarian fascist party that collaborated with the Nazis, and might have turned the family in.

They slept on sand, using a bucket for a toilet. Mrs. Nagy gave them what food she could, but was reluctant to draw attention to herself by buying and preparing more than she needed for herself, so the family lived mostly on potatoes and cabbage. Most of Kanitz's teeth fell out from lack of nutrition. "It was very cold and damp, and we were sick all the time with colds. And always, always hungry. You know how they say when your stomach touches your backbone. I became listless and every movement was an effort. My belly started to swell and my arms got very thin. At a certain point, I lost the hunger and became resigned to it, almost catatonic."

His mother kept them going with stories, prayers, and talk of what became Kanitz's favorite food, liver pâté. In January 1945, they began to hear bombs falling all around them, and planes flying overhead as the Allies arrived to liberate Hungary. "We didn't know who was dropping the bombs — English, American or Russian. But my mother told us, 'Don't worry about them. They are here to help us.'"

"One day, the trap door of the cellar opened, and a Romanian soldier looked in. "We came out of the cellar and there was a group of soldiers on horses, and they were patting us on the shoulder, giving us food and chocolates, and I was sicker than a dog. And that was the end of the war."

== After the war ==
The family went to Kanitz's paternal grandfather's home. His grandparents, Shamu and Gisella Kanitz (née Weiss), had been taken to Auschwitz and their home had been ransacked, so there was nothing inside, and no food available anywhere. "There were dead horses lying in the streets, and people were carving them up where they lay and taking the meat home. And that's what we lived on ... we ate horse, we ate donkey, we ate, I don't know what else we ate." The Kanitzs discovered that 100 members of the extended family had been killed.

In December 1945, Kanitz's father came home and joined the Communist Party, becoming party secretary for their part of the city, and later deputy minister of industry for Hungary. János Nagy was arrested along with other Arrow Cross Party members. The local party secretaries acted as judge and jury, and so Mrs. Nagy approached Kanitz's father to beg for her son's life, but he refused to help, and János Nagy was hanged.

She had saved my mother, brother and me, so now she asked my father to save her son in return. But my father refused. This caused a real family problem because my mother wanted him to do it, but he wouldn't. He said that saving three Jews does not wash the blood off someone who has probably killed hundreds.

Desperate to leave Hungary after his experiences, Kanitz ran away from home when he was 13. He was picked up and brought back, but he left again, the second time with his mother's blessing. He walked to the Austrian border, and from there traveled to Italy and then to Sheffield in England, where he found a job polishing knives. "I love the English. They were the first people to treat me like I was a human being." The family was later reunited and emigrated to Canada, where Tereza Kanitz was killed by a drunk driver in Terrace, British Columbia in 1964.

Kanitz found he was unable to speak about his experiences for over fifty years.

I blamed myself for being alive when everybody else died ... What did I do wrong that I survived? ... It's totally illogical. But it's a very, very strong feeling and it's something I could not shake for a long, long time. ... It was only by starting to ask questions, to study the history of the Jewish people, to find out what madness led people to such a philosophy of murder. ... Those who survived must bear witness ...

Kanitz gave many interviews and spoke about the Holocaust in schools and in the synagogue on Yom HaShoah or Holocaust Memorial Day. In 2005, he spoke at the Saskatoon opening of the Anne Frank in the World 1929–1945 exhibition, and on March 21, 2006, he received a Living in Harmony award from the government of Saskatchewan, which is given to people who have promoted intercultural harmony.

Kanitz died on November 9, 2006.

== See also ==
- History of the Jews in Hungary
- Survivor syndrome
