= Marcel Nadjari =

Holocaust survivor (1917-1971)

Marcel Nadjari (or Nadjary, Nadjar, Nadzari, Greek: Εμμανουήλ Μαρσέλ Νατζαρή Νατζαρής, Nazarene) (January 1, 1917 – July 31, 1971) was a Jewish-Greek survivor of the Auschwitz concentration camp. Nadjari was a member of the Sonderkommando in Birkenau from May 1944 to November 1944. He is one of three members of the Sonderkommando that wrote his memoirs after the war, along with Filip Müller and Leon Cohen. He took part in the preparation of the Sonderkommando uprising. He authored one of the 19 manuscripts of Sonderkommando members found near the ruins of the Birkenau crematoria.

== Biography ==
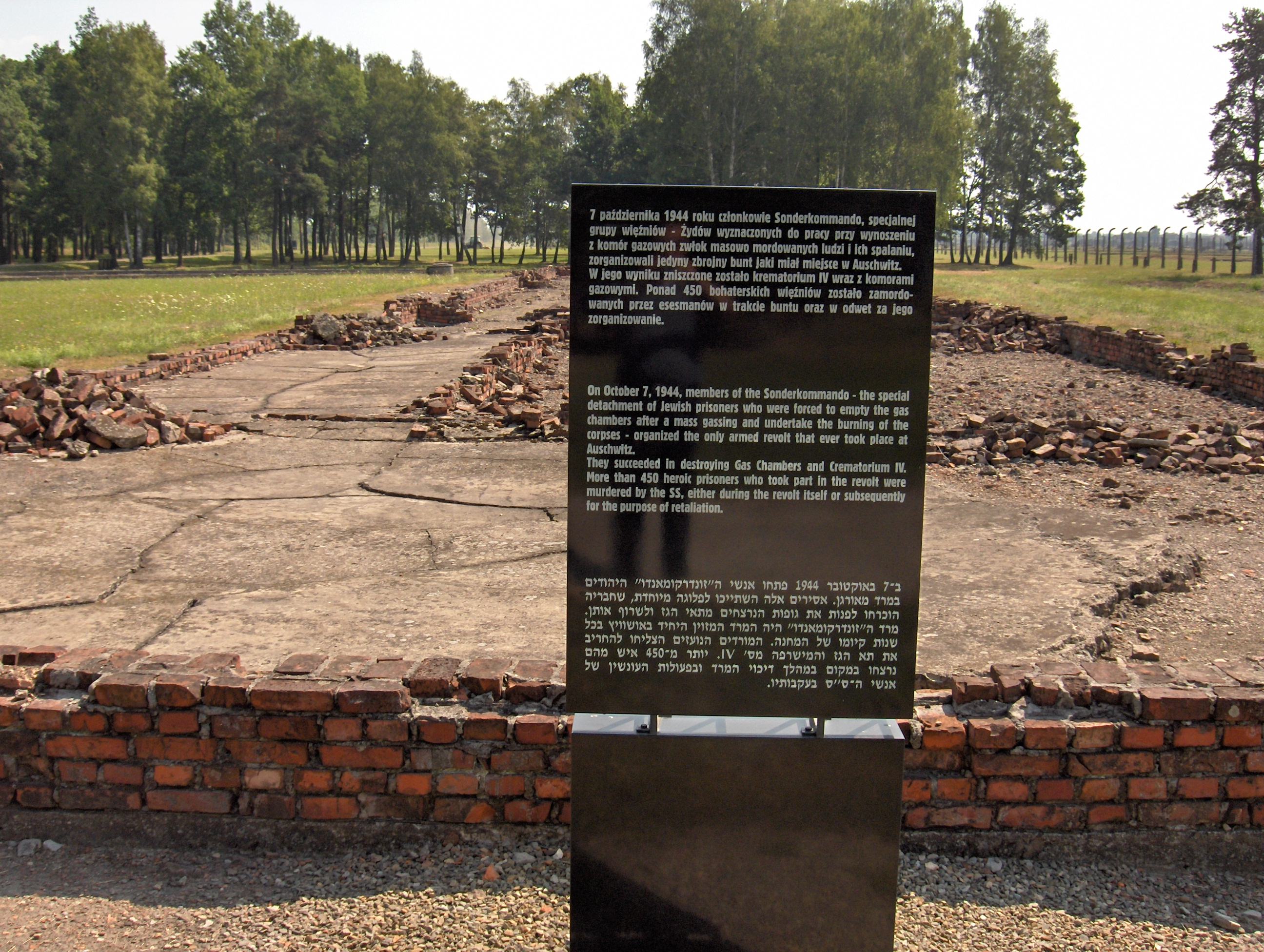
Ruins of Crematorium IV

Born in Salonika in 1917, Marcel Nadjari attended the Alsheikh French High School. His academic interests included drawing and painting. When he matured, he worked in his father's shop selling animal feed. He joined the military in 1937 and fought against the Italians in the 1940 Italian invasion of Albania (Invasion of Greece). In 1942, he was sent to a German labor camp with 1,500 other Jews. In 1943, his parents and his sister were deported from Salonika and later murdered in Auschwitz. He later escaped from the camp and moved to Athens, temporarily working for a soap manufacturer. In October 1943, he left Athens and was wounded in battle fighting with the communist resistance. He was denounced by a French woman as a "Zionist and smuggler to Palestine." On December 30, 1943, he was arrested and spent a month in the Averof Prison in Athens. He was tortured by the Germans until he confessed his Jewish identity, inevitably being sent to the Haidari concentration camp for two months.

=== Experiences in Auschwitz ===
He was deported from Athens on April 2, 1944 and arrived at the Auschwitz concentration camp on April 11 along with several other deportees. Of these arrivals, 1,872 deportees were immediately sent to be murdered in the gas chambers. Nadjari was one of the 320 Greek men selected for labor and he was assigned the number 182669. After spending two days in the Zentral Sauna in Birkenau, he and the other Greek men lived in Block 12 of the Männerquarantäne Lager from April 13 to May 11. Then he was selected, along with 100 Greeks, to be part of the Sonderkommando. He was assigned to Krematorium III and took part in the preparation for the Sonderkommando uprising, alongside Yaacov Kaminski, Lemke Chaïm Pliszko, Dawid Kotchak, Giuseppe Baruch, Leibl Paul Katz, Leon Cohen and Alberto Errera. However, during the uprising on October 7, 1944, the prisoners of the Krematorium III were quickly surrounded by the Germans and did not take part in the rebellion.

In November 1944, two months before the liberation of the camp, he buried a twelve-page manuscript written in Greek on November 3 on pages taken from a notebook, in which he described his observations of Auschwitz in a Thermos bottle and a briefcase near the Krematorium III.

After the rebellion, Nadjari and his comrades were drafted into the Abbruchkommando Krematorium and were put in charge of demolishing the crematoria. On January 18, 1945, the SS evacuated Auschwitz, and the few thousand inmates that could walk were filed out of the camp on a death march. Although the members of the Sonderkommando were not allowed to leave the camp, Nadjari and some comrades mingled with the crowd of prisoners. He survived the death march and arrived in the Mauthausen concentration camp on January 25. He was transferred to Melk and later to Gusen, from which he was liberated by the 11th Armored Division (United States) of the 3rd US Army on May 5, 1945.

=== After Auschwitz ===
Nadjari went back to Greece after being liberated. He began working at a hospital in Athens in 1947. He began a journal recalling his experiences in Auschwitz with no intention of publishing. He married Roza Saltiel in 1947. Together they had a son, Alberto, born in 1950. In 1951, they moved to the United States where he became a tailor. Their daughter Nelly was born in New York in 1957. Nadjari died of a heart attack on 31 July 1971 at the age of 54 in New York.

On October 24, 1980, Lesław Dyrcz, a student from the Brynek Forestry Vocational School, found a leather briefcase buried at about 40 centimeters deep in the ground while clearing the area around Birkenau crematorium III of stub and roots. Inside the briefcase was Nadjari's thermos liner. In his manuscript, he writes: I want to live, to revenge the deaths of Dad and Mum, and that of my beloved little sister Nelly. His 1947 report was published in 1991 in Greek under the title Χρονικό 1941–1945 [Chronicle].

In October 2017, the text discovered in 1980 in the Birkenau soil was revealed after a spectral treatment made in 2013 by Pavel Polian and Aleksandr Nikitjaev allowed for 85–90% of the manuscript to be legible.
