= Zalman Gradowski =

Auschwitz Sonderkommando diarist

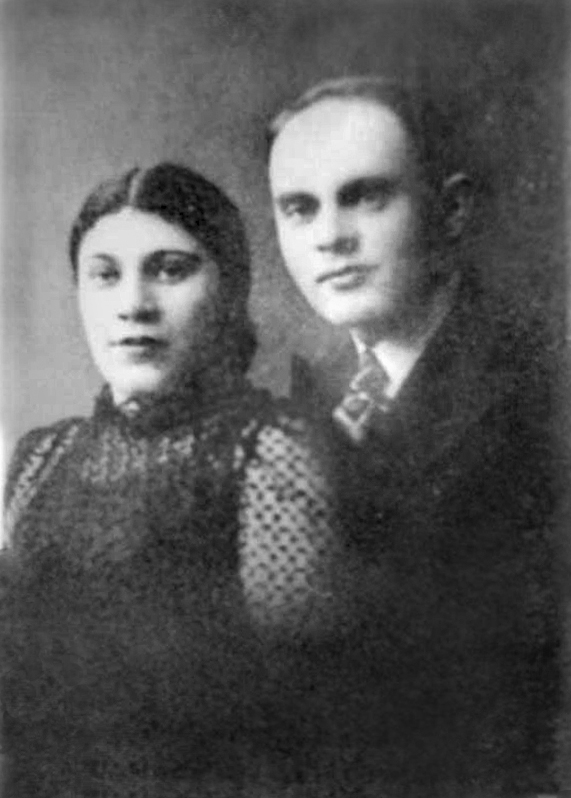
Zalman Gradowski and his wife Sonia on their wedding day, c. 1935

Zalman Gradowski or Chaim Zalman Gradowski (1910 – 7 October 1944) originally from Suwałki, was a Polish Jewish prisoner of the Auschwitz-Birkenau concentration camp during the Holocaust in occupied Poland, who kept a secret diary.

On November 2, 1942, he was deported, as were all Jews then living in Lunna, as well as neighboring towns, to the Kielbasin (Kolbasino) transit camp (Transitlager or Sammellager). On December 5, he and all his Jewish townsfolk (numbering approximately 1,500) were forcibly marched from the Kielbasin transit camp to Lososno, Poland, where they boarded a train bound for, as he later discovered, Auschwitz. The train arrived in Auschwitz-Birkenau on the morning of December 8. After selektion at Auschwitz-Birkenau, his family, as well as all women and children (and most of the men who were on the transport), were immediately sent to the gas chamber and murdered. Shortly afterward, Gradowski and several others from the transport who survived selektion were sent to work in crematoria as part of the Sonderkommando slave labour unit.

== Life ==
Zalman Gradowski was born the son of Sarah and Shmuel Gradowski, who was trained as a rabbi and worked as a cantor. He and his two brothers, Moyshl and Avrom-Eber, visited the Yeshiva of Lomza; his two brothers taught at a yeshiva in Suwałki, while Zalman worked in his father's clothing store. Due to the good libraries there and the discussions of literary texts in the Jewish community, he was able to pursue his interest in literature intensively. Gradowski had a lively exchange about literature before the beginning of the war with the Yiddish writer David Sfar, his wife's brother-in-law and the only survivor of the family, and Sfar remembered Gradowski as someone who dreamed of a life as a writer. Gradowski was the most politically committed of the brothers, with an early interest in Zionism.

In the early 1930s he married Sonja Sara Złotojabłko from the city of Lunna, to which they fled after the German Wehrmacht occupied Suwałki in early September 1939. In the summer of 1941 the Wehrmacht occupied Lunna, where a ghetto was established in November in which Gradowski was a member of the Jewish Council, responsible for sanitary and health matters. Exactly one year later all the ghetto inhabitants of the region were taken to the Kiełbasin concentration camp near Grodno, where Gradowski had worked as a doctor in the Grodno ghetto.

In December 1942, Gradowski was deported in a train to Auschwitz-Birkenau, where the majority of the deportees were immediately murdered—including all his family members. First he was assigned to the Sonderkommando in gas bunkers I and II, then to the crematorium.

He helped plan and organize the Sonderkommando Revolt in Auschwitz of Jewish prisoners against the German guards on October 7, 1944, during which prisoners set the building of gas chamber and Crematorium IV on fire, causing serious damage while attacking SS men in the vicinity. A group of prisoners who worked in gas chamber and Crematorium II killed a kapo named Karl Toepfer, attacked SS guards, and made an unsuccessful attempt to blow up furnaces. A group of prisoners cut through the barbed wire fences enclosing the crematorium as well as the adjacent women's camp and fled in a southerly direction, where they encountered a three-man SS patrol whom they stabbed to death. SS chase units caught up with the prisoners 1.5 kilometres from the crematorium at which point the prisoners were killed. During the revolt and a result of repressions after it, some 452 Jewish prisoners were killed, among them Zalman Gradowski. Four Jewish female prisoners who had smuggled gunpowder from the nearby munition factory to the Sonderkommando were later hanged in a public execution.

== Secret diary ==
In order to bear witness for future generations, Gradowski wrote a secret diary in Yiddish, describing his life and the camp. Gradowski's texts were written in Auschwitz-Birkenau, where they were found after the liberation of the camp. He buried his notebook in the camp as a time capsule. In it, Gradowski provided a detailed description of the extermination process in Birkenau. He was one of the key figures in the Sonderkommando underground at Auschwitz, where he was murdered during the revolt of 7 October 1944.

A quotation from the diary is the epigraph for the 2015 book KL: A History of the Nazi Concentration Camps: "May the world at least behold a drop, a fraction of this tragic world in which we lived." In another memorable passage, he wrote: "I pass on to you only a small part of what took place in the hell of Birkenau-Auschwitz. It is for you to comprehend the reality. I have written a great deal besides this. I am certain that you will come upon these remnants, and from them you will be able to construct a picture of how our people were killed... In this way I hope to immortalize the dear, beloved names of those for whom, at this moment, I cannot even expend a tear! For I live in an inferno of death, where it is impossible to measure my great losses.”

The introduction of the book is him immortalizing his family and his last wish for them to not be forgotten. His murdered family included his mother (Sarah), sister (Libe), sister (Esther Rokhl), wife (Sonia), father and brother-in-law (Raphael and Wolf). All named members of his family were gassed for being "unfit". His father, two brothers and another sister were also taken and he did not know what happened to them. He wrote of all of them in the introduction to his diary.

== See also ==
- People Love Dead Jews, a 2021 book by Dara Horn, in which Gradowski is discussed
- List of Holocaust diarists
- List of diarists
- List of posthumous publications of Holocaust victims
