= Daniel Bennahmias =

Greek Holocaust survivor

Daniel Bennahmias (1923 – 22 October 1994) was a Greek-born Jewish Italian national captured by the Nazis in Greece during World War II and transported to Auschwitz-Birkenau concentration camp. He was used by the camp guards in a Sonderkommando (German: 'special (command) unit' or 'task force'), a euphemism for a group forced to dispose of the corpses of fellow prisoners under the threat of execution. He was one of eleven Greeks in Sonderkommandos who survived the Holocaust.

== Biography ==
Daniel Bennahmias was born in Thessaloniki to Italian parents Harriet and Mark Bennahmias. His father worked at the bureau of information. Along with his parents, he had historical Italian citizenship. He studied Italian in Greece, attending an Italian college there (at home he spoke French and he also understood Judaeo-Spanish). On completion of college, he had planned to study medicine in Padua but the Greco-Italian War began. As Italian citizens, he and his father were interned by the Greeks before the Nazis liberated them in 1941 and initially treated them well. In 1942, the Jews began to be treated harshly (e.g. being forced to exercise all day in public) and in 1943, by which time he had returned to Thessaloniki with his father, Jews were rounded up by Nazis. His family went to Athens, where some thousands of Jews had escaped to, but in any case his family's Italian citizenship afforded a temporary respite there. In September 1943, the Italians surrendered to the Allies. The family went into hiding but were compromised and found by the Nazis in March 1944 and placed in Haidari concentration camp. On 2 April, they were sent by train to Auschwitz-Birkenau crammed into open goods wagons. On the journey, they were reduced to relieving themselves openly; a woman died on his mother's chest and lay there for two days. When they arrived on 11 April, he was separated from his parents, who were murdered immediately.

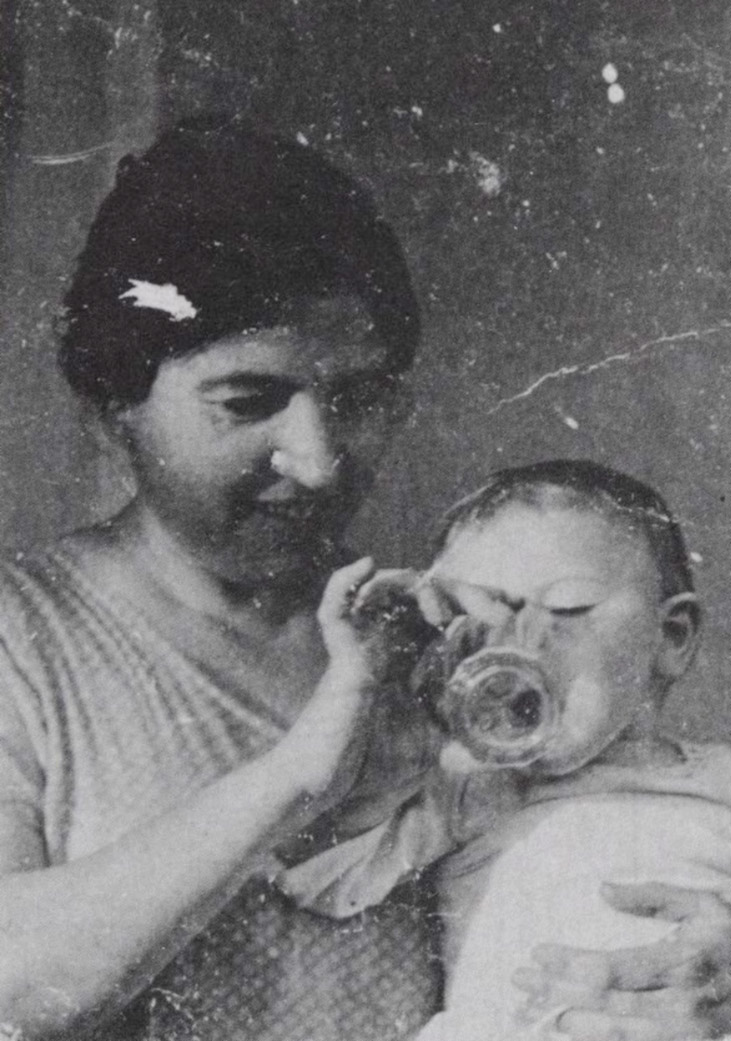
Bennahmias with his mother in Thessaloniki, c.1923

=== Placement in a Sonderkommando ===
At the camp, Bennahmias was quarantined for a month. He was selected to join the Sonderkommando in 'block 13' and was told he would be cremating the dead. A Frenchman, whom he initially considered crazy, then filled him in on the truth of what was happening. His job was in the operation for crematorium No.2, disentangling corpses from the gas chamber, but kept passing out. A Polish foreman named 'Koczak' slapped him to rouse him, explaining that he would be killed otherwise. He was saved when the foreman returned him to the block, where he cleaned for a week before going back to the same job, separating the bodies using a belt and the crook of a walking cane, which for a full gas chamber took about eight hours. The subsequent job for others was to cut off the hair and remove gold from teeth before the bodies were placed in a lift to be raised one level to the oven. The gas chamber would then need to be hosed clean and whitewashed so the next group might believe it was a shower. A revolt was organised with a plan to blow up the crematoria, in which Bennahmias and the Greek Dario Gabbai – convinced they were to be killed anyway – were given the task of disarming their Nazi guard, but the revolt was postponed before eventually being started in error, at a time when there many more Nazi guards present. Hundreds in the Sonderkommando were then shot, with hundreds more taken to Mauthausen concentration camp for execution. He was reassigned to a job using a bone-crushing machine. By then, Bennahmias had witnessed a baby being shot, children thrown over the heads of adults to fit them into the gas chamber and he was used to eating his lunch with the cadavers. If there were too few people to make gassing worthwhile, Nazi soldiers simply shot them in front of the ovens. By October, no more people were brought to the crematorium. He and other remaining members of the Sonderkommando were ordered to dismantle the crematoria buildings.

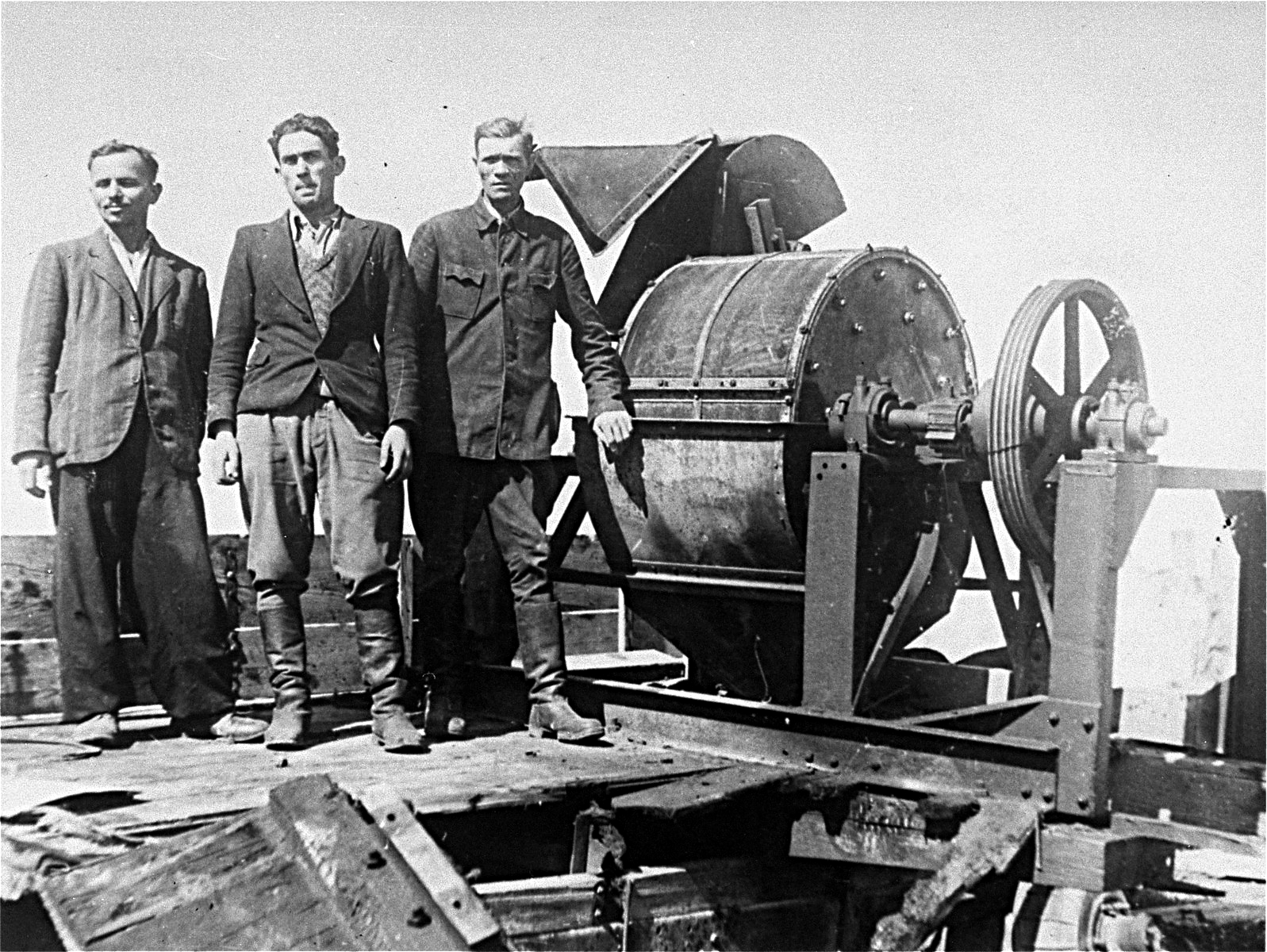
An example of a bone-crushing machine that Sonderkommandos were forced to use.

=== Closure of Auschwitz-II and return to Greece ===
On 18 January 1945, with the eastern front very near, they were marched eight kilometres in the snow – verbally abused by some local people – to Auschwitz-III from where they were taken through Czechoslovakia by lorry and train. The Czechs threw salamis and other food to them as they passed. There was a further march to Ebensee, a satellite camp of Mauthausen. He was put to work in an underground weapons factory, where he collapsed due to an infected foot from the march. He spent a week in hospital after being operated on, before being sent back to the weapons factory. The infection set in again and a further period in the hospital coincided with the arrival American Army and his reunion with Gabbai. After receiving identity cards from the Americans on 26 May 1943, the pair travelled by train through Italy where they were treated kindly. They arrived by cargo plane in Athens on 2 July, aged 22. He sought out his friend, Dr. Benveniste, and assisted him at a community hospital before employment feeding and clothing displaced people at the Joint Distribution committee, where he met also met his future wife. He worked as a correspondent for over two years. He married in 1951.

=== Emigration to the United States ===
His wife, who was studying in Milwaukee, eventually persuaded him to go to the US, where they settled. They had two children. He gained a BSc in chemistry from the University of California, Berkeley. His wife died of cancer when she was 42. Bennahmias worked as a chemist for 23 years before becoming a merchant. He died on 22 October 1994.
