= Christophe Cognet =

French film director

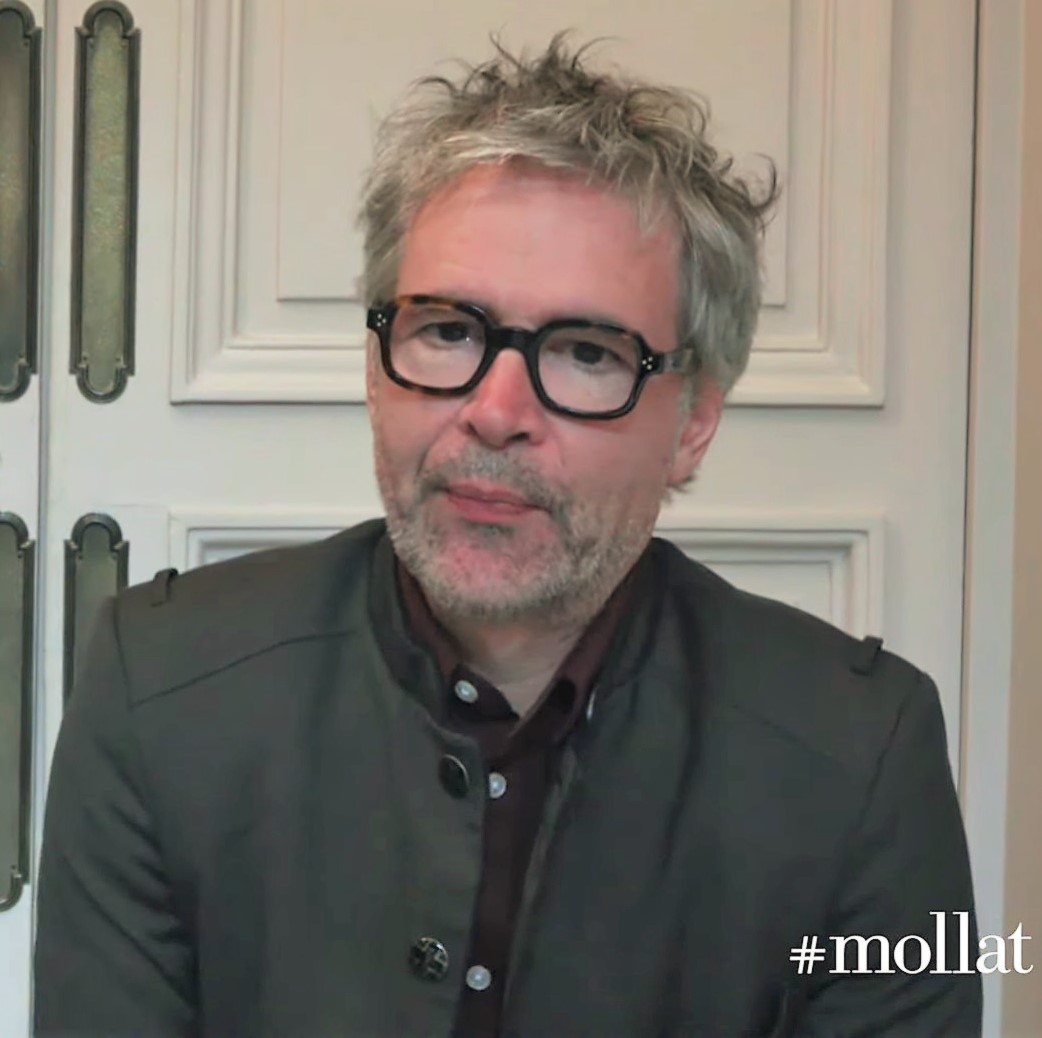
- Cognet in 2019
- Occupations: Film director; documentary filmmaker

Christophe Cognet is a French film director and documentary filmmaker.

== Filmography ==
Director

- 2021 From Where They Stood
- 2013: Parce que j'étais peintre, l'art rescapé des camps nazis, 104 min, film documentaire, La Huit Production, coproduction franco-allemande, diffusé par Jour2fête, film écrit par Christophe Cognet, Jean Breschand et Pierre-François Moreau.
- 2008 : Les Anneaux du serpent, 45 min, essai documentaire, production Tarmak Films.
- 2006 : Quand nos yeux sont fermés, 55 min, film documentaire, La Huit Production, Tigon Films Distributors LTD diffusions.
- 2004: L'Atelier de Boris, 96 min, film documentaire, Corto-Pacific, 24 Images.
- 2003: Promesses d'un rivage, 53 min, film documentaire, La Huit Production.
- 2002 : La Planète perdue, 51 min, film documentaire, production La Huit Production, Republic Pictures.
- 2001: Les Sentiers de Fred Vargas, 27 min, film documentaire, La Huit Production.
- 2000 : L'Affaire Dominici par Orson Welles, 52 min, film documentaire, La Huit Production, Gray Film Sipirs, Euro-London-Film.
- 1998 : La Mer en colimaçon, 58 min, film documentaire, La Huit Production, CNDP.
- 1997 : Gongonbill, de l'autre côté de la colline, coréalisé avec Stéphane Jourdain, 63 min, film documentaire, La Huit Production.
- 1994 : La Voix des génies, coréalisé avec Stéphane Jourdain, 52 min, film documentaire, La Huit Production, Cité TV, TNB.

=== Nominations ===
- Grand Prix des Escales documentaires de La Rochelle 2014, France, Parce que j'étais peintre, art rescapé des camps nazis.
- Sélectionné au Festival international de Rome (Italie) 2014, Parce que j'étais peintre, art rescapé des camps nazis.
- Sélectionné au Festival dei Popoli (Florence) 2008, Les Anneaux du serpent, 45 min, essai documentaire.
- Sélectionné au FIPA 2004, Écrans du réel 2006, L'Atelier de Boris, 96 min, film documentaire.
- Sélectionné au festival international du film d’Amiens 2003, La Planète perdue, 51 min, film documentaire.
- Sélectionné au festival international du film La Rochelle 2000, FID 2004, Rencontres de la cinémathèque de Munich 2002, festival du film de Montréal 2003, Mostra de Venise 2000, International film festival de São Paulo 2002, festival international du cinéma de Copenhague 2002, L'Affaire Dominici par Orson Welles, 52 min, film documentaire.
- Sélectionné au festival FIPA 1997, Bilan du Film ethnographique, Cinéma du Réel 1997, États Généraux du Film Documentaire 1997, Ecrans Documentaires 1997, Gongonbill, de l'autre côté de la colline, coréalisé avec Stéphane Jourdain, 63 min, film documentaire.

=== Publications ===
- Boris Taslitzky, dessins faits à Buchenwald, direction d’ouvrage avec E. Taslitzky, Adam Biro éditeur, Paris, 2009, 256 pages, préface de Jorge Semprún avec des contributions de Christophe Cognet, Lionel Richard et Annette Wieviorka, ISBN 978-2351190548.
- L’Art clandestin à Buchenwald, in Résister à Buchenwald, ouvrage collectif, éditions Tirésisas, Paris, 2006, 144 pages, ISBN 2-915293-37-6.
- La mer en colimaçon avec F. Costa, éditions CNDP, Paris, 1997, 116 pages.
