= Georges Didi-Huberman =

French philosopher and art historian

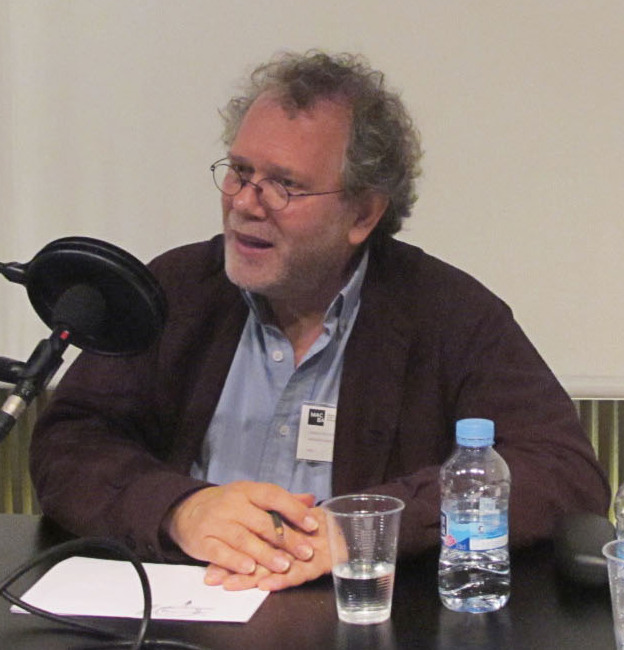
- Didi-Huberman interviewed by Radio Web MACBA, 2014
- Born: 13 June 1953 (age 73); Saint-Étienne, France
- Occupations: Philosopher, art historian

Georges Didi-Huberman FBA (born 13 June 1953) is a French philosopher and art historian.

== Biography ==
Georges Didi-Huberman was born on 13 June 1953 in Saint-Étienne, into a Sephardic family from Tunisia on his father's side and Ashkenazi Polish heritage on his mother's side. His sister is the actress Évelyne Didi. He was a scholar at the French Academy in Rome (Villa Medici) and resident in the Berenson Foundation of Villa I Tatti in Florence. He teaches at the School for Advanced Studies in the Social Sciences, where he has been a lecturer since 1990.

== Honours ==
He is the 2015 recipient of the Adorno Prize.

In July 2017, Didi-Huberman was elected a Corresponding Fellow of the British Academy (FBA), the United Kingdom's national academy for the humanities and social sciences.

=== Other awards and distinctions ===
- 2019: Prix de la Principauté de Monaco, a lifetime achievement award granted jointly by Les Rencontres Philosophiques de Monaco and the Prince Pierre Foundation.
- 2025: Pour le Mérite for Sciences and Arts

== Published work ==
- Invention de l’hystérie. Charcot et l’Iconographie photographique de la Salpêtrière, sur l'École de la Salpêtrière, Macula, 1982 (translated into English as Invention of Hysteria: Charcot and the Photographic Iconography of the Salpêtrière, MIT Press, 2004).
- Mémorandum de la peste. Le fléau d’imaginer, Christian Bourgois, 1983.
- La Peinture incarnée followed by Chef-d'œuvre inconnu de Balzac, Minuit, 1985.
- Fra Angelico. Dissemblance et figuration, Flammarion, 1990 (translated into English as Fra Angelico: Dissemblance and Figuration, Univ. of Chicago Press, 1995).
- Devant l’image. Questions posées aux fins d'une histoire de l'art, Minuit, 1990 (translated into English as Confronting Images: Questioning the Ends of a Certain History of Art, Penn State Univ. Press, 2004).
- Ce que nous voyons, ce qui nous regarde, Minuit, 1992.
- Le Cube et le visage. Autour d’une sculpture d’Alberto Giacometti Macula, 1992 (translated into English as The Cube and the Face: Around a Sculpture by Alberto Giacometti, Diaphanes, 2015).
- L'Empreinte du ciel, présentation des Caprices de la foudre, Éditions Antigone, 1994.
- La Ressemblance informe, ou Le gai savoir visuel selon Georges Bataille, Macula, 1995.
- Phasmes. Essais sur l'apparition, Minuit 1998.
- L’Étoilement, sur Simon Hantaï, Minuit, 1998.
- La Demeure, la souche, sur Pascal Convert, Minuit, 1999.
- Ouvrir Vénus. Nudité, rêve, cruauté, Gallimard, 1999.
- Devant le temps, Minuit, 2000.
- Être crâne, sur Giuseppe Penone, Minuit, 2000 (translated into English as Being a Skull: Site, Contact, Thought, Sculpture, Univocal Publishing, 2016).
- L’Homme qui marchait dans la couleur, sur James Turrell, Minuit, 2001 (translated into English as The Man Who Walked in Color, Univocal Publishing, 2017).
- Génie du non-lieu, sur Claudio Parmiggiani, Minuit, 2001.
- L’Image survivante, Minuit, 2002 (translated into English as The Surviving Image: Phantoms of Time and Time of Phantoms, Penn State Univ. Press, 2016).
- Ninfa moderna. Essai sur le drapé tombé, Gallimard, 2002.
- Images malgré tout, Minuit, 2004 (translated into English as Images in Spite of All: Four Photographs from Auschwitz, Univ. of Chicago Press, 2012).
- Gestes d’air et de pierre, Minuit, 2005.
- Le Danseur des solitudes, sur Israel Galván, Minuit, 2006.
- L'Image ouverte. Motifs de l'incarnation dans les arts visuels, Gallimard, 2007.
- La Ressemblance par contact, Minuit, 2008.
- L'Œil de l'histoire – Tome 1 : Quand les images prennent position, Minuit, 2009 (translated into English as The Eye of History: When Images Take Positions, MIT Press, 2018).
- Survivance des lucioles, Minuit, 2009 (translated into English as Survival of the Fireflies, Univ. of Minnesota Press, 2018).
- L'Œil de l'histoire – Tome 2 : Remontages du temps subi, Minuit, 2010. ISBN 978-2-7073-2136-7
- L’Œil de l'Histoire – Tome 3 : Atlas ou le gai savoir inquiet, Minuit, 2011 (translated into English as Atlas, or the Anxious Gay Science, Univ. of Chicago Press, 2018).
- Écorces, Minuit, 2011 (translated into English as Bark, MIT Press, 2017).
- L'Œil de l'histoire – Tome 4 : Peuples exposés, peuples figurants, Minuit, 2012.
- Essayer voir, Minuit, 2014, ISBN 978-2-7073-2365-1.

== Notes and references ==
- Revue Nunc numéro 26, février 2012 – Cahier G. Didi-Huberman dirigé par Jérôme de Gramont – Editions de Corlevour
