= Eddy de Wind =

Dutch writer

- Born: 6 February 1916; The Hague, Netherlands
- Died: 27 September 1987 (aged 71); Amsterdam, Netherlands
- Occupation: Author

Eddy de Wind (né Eliazar de Wind; 6 February 1916 – 27 September 1987) was a Dutch-Jewish Holocaust survivor, physician, psychiatrist, psychoanalyst, and the author of the memoir ‘Eindstation Auschwitz. Mijn verhaal vanuit het kamp (1943–1945)', which was published in the United States in 2020 under the title Last Stop Auschwitz. De Wind was the first, and perhaps the only doctor who, after passing his medical exam, voluntarily went to the Westerbork transit camp for Jews to assist the deportees there.

== German Occupation ==
After the German invasion of the Netherlands of May 1940, in early 1941, the German occupiers forced Dutch Universities to exclude Jewish staff and students. However, Eddy, who was studying medicine at the University of Leiden, was able, with the help of his professors, to accelerate his studies. He was, in fact, the last Jewish medical student to receive a degree from the University of Leiden. Eddy reported to the camp after his mother was arrested and taken to Westerbork. The Jewish council promised him that if he volunteered to register as a doctor for the transit camp, his mother would be released. However, when De Wind arrived at Westerbork, it turned out that his mother had already been taken to Auschwitz. Nevertheless, Eddy stayed at Westerbork, where he met his first wife, a nurse at the camp, Friedel Komornik and even married. In the end Eddy and his new wife were both deported to Auschwitz.

== Auschwitz ==
In Auschwitz Eddy served as a ‘haftling’ (prisoner) doctor in Block 9 at the main Auschwitz camp, with Haftlingsnummer (Prisoner number) 150822. Because of his status as a doctor he had some freedom of movement within the camp and because of his language (German, Dutch, French) skills he was able to communicate with many, thus acquiring information necessary for survival, such as conveniently being elsewhere during selections for the gas chamber. He survived the camp, due to a combination of his language skills, medical training, luck and fortuitous decisions, such as hiding and refusing to join one of the death marches. He was one of the few Jewish prisoners who was liberated by the Soviet army. After the liberation of the camp, he stayed at the request of the Russians to help take care of the sick.

== Life after the War ==
After returning to the Netherlands, he specialized as a psychiatrist and psychoanalyst. He devoted a considerable amount of his time to dealing with war trauma. In 1946, de Wind was the first to publish about Concentration Camp Syndrome (KZ Syndrome) in an article entitled 'Confrontatie met de dood' or ‘Confrontation with death’. KZ syndrome would now be recognized as Post-Traumatic Stress Disorder (PTSD) and Survivor's Guilt. In 1946 he published his memoir as ‘Eindstation Auschwitz. Mijn verhaal vanuit het kamp (1943–1945)’ or ‘Auschwitz Terminal Station’, a detailed account of his imprisonment, written in the camp itself, after liberation by the Russian army. An English translation ‘Last Stop Auschwitz: My Story of Survival from within the Camp’ was published in 2020. It is believed to be the only survivor testimony written in Auschwitz itself. After the War, de Wind divorced the woman he had met in Westerbork. He remarried and had three children. Eddy de Wind (‘Edward de Vind’) is quoted in the Soviet Union report presented to the Nuremberg Tribunal (USSR-008): (translated)…"A Dutch fascist was found murdered in a residential area. In retaliation, the Germans arrested 400 hostages, including myself. They picked me up in the street and sent me to this camp."
