= List of works about Theresienstadt Ghetto =

Theresienstadt Ghetto was a concentration camp established by Nazi Germany during World War II in the garrison town of Terezín (German: Theresienstadt), located in German-occupied Protectorate of Bohemia and Moravia.

== Documentary films ==
- Theresienstadt (1944 film) A Nazi propaganda film. Only 20 minutes survives of the originally 90 minute film.
- Where Death Wears a Smile (1985). Produced by Australian journalist Paul Rea, the film alleges that dozens of Allied POWs were murdered at Terezín, where they had been illegally held. These claims were refuted by Alexander McClelland, an Australian veteran and former prisoner at the Small Fortress, in his book The Answer – Justice.
- Paradise Camp (1986)
- Un vivant qui passe, from a 1979 interview with Maurice Rossel — a Red Cross official known for producing an unwarrantedly favorable report on Theresienstadt—by Claude Lanzmann; the film was later released with English subtitles as "A Visitor from the Living"
- Voices of the Children (1997), American, made for television
- A Story about a Bad Dream (2000)
- Prisoner of Paradise (2002)
- Defiant Requiem: Voices of Resistance (2013). Film of a multi-media concert-drama performance in New York City; broadcast on PBS.
- The Last of the Unjust (2013) directed by Claude Lanzmann, about Benjamin Murmelstein, a surviving elder of Theresienstadt
- Berlin Calling (2013), follows a second generation Holocaust survivor who retraces her father's footsteps to Theresienstadt; directed by Nigel Dick
- The Lady in Number 6: Music Saved My Life (2014), the story of Alice Herz-Sommer

== Dramatic films ==
- Transport from Paradise (Transport z ráje) (1962), Czech
- Holocaust (1978), television mini-series
- War and Remembrance (1988), television mini-series; part of the Winds of War adaptation
- The Last Butterfly (Poslední motýl) (1991), in Czech and English, dubbed, with actor Tom Courtenay
- Defiant Requiem (2012), United States, film

== Plays ==
- Un opéra pour Terezín (1989) by Liliane Atlan
- Dreams of Beating Time (1994), by Roy Kift. Concerns the classical musicians in Terezín, most especially the conductor Kurt Singer, and the parallel career of Wilhelm Fürtwängler in Germany.
- Camp Comedy (1998), by Roy Kift. The play deals with the dilemma of the German cabaret star Kurt Gerron who was "requested" by the Nazis to make a documentary film about the "sweet lives" of the Jewish inmates in the camp. It contains original songs and texts from the Karussell cabaret. It premiered in Legnica (Liegnitz), Poland, in September 2012 under the title Komedia Obozowa, and was subsequently invited to the annual Warsaw Theatre Meeting in 2013. It won the Broken Barrier award as the best play at the 24th "Without Borders" Theatre Festival in Cieszyn, Poland, and Cieszyn, Czech Republic, in the same year.
- Way to Heaven (Himmelweg) (2005), by Juan Mayorga, an award-winning Spanish playwright; inspired by the visit of the Red Cross to Theresienstadt. The play has been produced worldwide.
- And A Child Shall Lead (2005), a play by American writer Michael Slade. The story of children coming of age in Terezin, In the face of unspeakable horror, these children use their determination and creativity to build lives filled with hope and beauty—playing, studying, making art, and writing an underground newspaper.
- Signs of Life (2010), a musical drama with book by Peter Ullian, lyrics by Len Schiff, and music by Joel Derfner. First developed in 2003 as Terezin, it had concert performances in New York and workshops in Seattle. Debuting Off-Broadway as Signs of Life in 2010, it has also played in the Czech Republic and in Chicago.
- I Never Saw Another Butterfly by Celeste Raspanti

== Music ==
- Songs for Children (1991). New York-based composer Robert Convery wrote a cantata based on poems written by children interned at Terezin.
- Oratorio Terezin (2003). Canadian musician Ruth Fazal composed this full-length production scored for orchestra, children's choir, adult choir, and three vocal soloists. The oratorio is based on children's poetry from Terezín, combined with passages from the Hebrew scriptures. It premiered in Toronto, and subsequently visited concert halls in Prague, Brno, Vienna, and Bratislava, and toured Israel. It was the main cultural event of Holocaust Memorial Day in Tel Aviv in 2005.
- Terezín – Theresienstadt, 2008 album by Swedish mezzo-soprano Anne Sofie von Otter
- Cantata for the Children of Terezin by Mary Ann Joyce-Walter.

== Literature ==
- Somewhere There is Still a Sun: A Memoir of the Holocaust (2015) by Michael Gruenbaum with Todd Hasak-Lowy
- Austerlitz (2001), W. G. Sebald
- Eine Reise (1962), H. G. Adler, The Journey (2008), translated by Peter Filkins
- Theresienstadter Bilderbogen (1942), by H. G. Adler
- Holocaust: Theresienstadt requiem (1965), by Joseph Bohr
- War and Remembrance (1978) by Herman Wouk; several chapters follow the Jewish characters of Aaron Jastrow and his niece, Natalie Henry, when they are held in Theresienstadt.
