= Karl Rahm =

German war criminal (1907-1947)

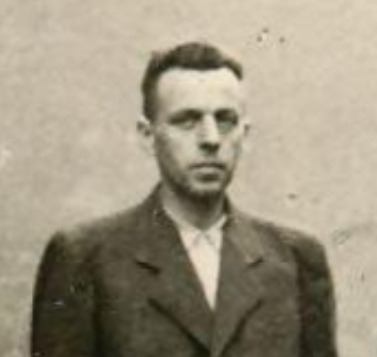
- Rahm after his capture in 1945
- Born: 2 April 1907; Klosterneuburg, Austria-Hungary
- Died: 30 April 1947 (aged 40); Litoměřice, Czechoslovakia
- Status: Executed by hanging
- Conviction: Crimes against humanity
- Penalty: Death
- Military career
- Allegiance: Nazi Germany
- Branch: Schutzstaffel
- Service years: 1938–1945
- Rank: SS-Sturmbannführer
- Commands: Theresienstadt concentration camp

Karl Rahm (2 April 1907 – 30 April 1947) was a Sturmbannführer (major) in the German Schutzstaffel who, from February 1944 to May 1945, served as the commandant of the Theresienstadt concentration camp. Rahm was the third and final commander of the camp, succeeding Siegfried Seidl and Anton Burger. He was hanged for war crimes.

== Early life and Nazi membership ==
Rahm was born in 1907 in the city of Klosterneuburg, in what was then the Austro-Hungarian Empire. He apprenticed as a toolmaker and worked for a time in Vienna, where during the 1920s he was exposed to the activities of the Austrian Nazi Party. He became a member of the Nazi Party in the early 1930s and joined the underground Austrian SS at the same time. In 1938, after the Anschluss with Nazi Germany, Rahm became an SS officer attached to SS-Oberabschnitt Donau under the command of Ernst Kaltenbrunner. His brother Franz was deported to a concentration camp as a Communist.

== World War II ==
At the start of World War II in 1939, Rahm was an SS-Obersturmführer in the Allgemeine SS. Applying for transfer to full-time SS duties, Rahm was attached to the Gestapo and assigned to the Central Agency for Jewish Emigration in Vienna, where he served under Adolf Eichmann. In 1940, he was transferred to Prague into the same office, as a deputy of Hans Günther. In March 1941, Rahm was briefly sent to the Netherlands together with Günther, to set up the same institution here, which however failed.

=== Theresienstadt ===
Rahm was promoted to SS-Sturmbannführer in February 1944 and ordered to assume duties as Kommandant (commander) of the Theresienstadt camp. One of his first duties was to oversee the camp "beautification project" as a prelude for orchestrating the infamous show-tour of the concentration camp to the International Red Cross (IRC). The affair was part of a much larger scheme to influence world opinion that Jews in Nazi-occupied Europe were well treated. After the IRC visit, Rahm supervised the creation of a propaganda film, Theresienstadt. Ein Dokumentarfilm aus dem jüdischen Siedlungsgebiet (Terezin: A Documentary Film of the Jewish Resettlement), that was to be shown in neutral countries.

During his time as Kommandant, Rahm oversaw mass deportations of Jews from Theresienstadt to Auschwitz concentration camp, the heaviest volume of which occurred in the fall of 1944, after the IRC visit and the making of the propaganda film. 18,000 people were deported within one month. Theresienstadt had imprisoned prominent artists, musicians, and intellectuals of the era, some of whom died in Theresienstadt or subsequently in Auschwitz.

Rahm was known for his cynical and rash character; he frequently beat prisoners himself and oversaw torture sessions. On the other hand, Rahm appears to have had an interesting, almost cordial relationship with some Jewish inmates, especially those who shared his working-class Viennese background. He was also known to spare some Jews from deportation (albeit in return for a bribe) as well as on occasion referring to members of the Theresienstadt Judenrat in the German tense of Sie (indicating respect) instead of du, even in front of other SS officers.

== Post-war capture, trial, and execution ==
Rahm evacuated Theresienstadt on 5 May 1945, along with the last of the SS personnel. He was captured shortly afterward by American forces in Austria and extradited in 1947 to Czechoslovakia. Put on trial, Rahm was found guilty of crimes against humanity and sentenced to death. Rahm was hanged on 30 April 1947, four hours after his guilty verdict had been handed down by the Czech court.

== Depictions in media ==
In the mini-series War and Remembrance, Rahm is portrayed by British actor Robert Stephens. John Collin portrayed Rahm in the miniseries Holocaust.
