= Franz Novak =

Austrian SS officer and war criminal

- Born: 10 January 1913; Wolfsberg, Carinthia, Austria
- Died: 21 October 1983 (aged 70); Langenzersdorf, Austria
- Occupation: SS-Hauptsturmführer
- Employer: RSHA
- Organization: Schutzstaffel
- Political party: Nazi Party
- Criminal charges: War crimes, crimes against humanity

Franz Novak (10 January 1913 – 21 October 1983) was an Austrian SS-Hauptsturmführer (captain). He was Adolf Eichmann's railway and transportation timetable expert, and coordinated the railway deportation of European Jews to concentration and extermination camps.

== Biography ==
Novak left school in 1928 and began an apprenticeship in printing in Wolfsberg. He printed the Unterkärntner Nachrichten, an anti-semitic local newspaper, close to the Greater German People's Party. In October 1929, he became a member of the Hitler Youth. In April 1933, he joined the SA, a month after joining the Nazi Party. After the party was banned in Austria in July 1933, he was an Illegal Nationalsocialist and became chief of the Wolfsberg section of the NSBO and SA leader. He participated in the July Putsch against Engelbert Dollfuss in July 1934. After its failure, he fled to Yugoslavia and then went to Germany and joined, like other Putsch participants (e.g. Robert Haider, father of Jörg Haider) the Austrian (Nazi) Legion. After the "Anschluss" in 1938, he moved to Vienna and became the deputy of Adolf Eichmann in the Central Agency for Jewish Emigration in Vienna, although he received his orders directly from Rolf Günther. Novak also became a member of the SS; on 1 December 1938 he was promoted to SS-Untersturmführer.

=== World War II ===
In July 1939, he participated in the opening of the Central Agency for Jewish Emigration in Prague, where his immediate superior was SS-Sturmbannführer Hans Günther. At the beginning of 1940, Eichmann brought Novak with him to the RSHA in Berlin and put him in his new office, the Eichmannreferat, on "Jewish matters and evacuations". His immediate superior was once again Rolf Günther. Novak handled the technical problems of organizing deportation trains "resettling" Poles and Jews from the incorporated territories to the General Government in 1940–41; he requisitioned railcars from Deutsche Reichsbahn for deportation and coordinated with it the hours of passages of these trains in coordination with the SS, police and concentration camp officials. Novak worked closely with the SiPo (Security Police); it was his job to inform each regional and district office of the SiPo of the date and quota (usually 1,000 people) of the train that the SiPo was to fill with Jewish deportees. Novak also worked closely with other leaders of the "Jewish question" in other countries, such as Theodor Dannecker, Alois Brunner and Dieter Wisliceny.

He was then part of the Eichmann-Kommando in Budapest which, from 15 March to 9 July 1944, led 476,000 Hungarian Jews to Auschwitz. Novak deported 6,000 to 12,000 people every day. Most of the deportees were killed immediately after their arrival at Auschwitz. By the end of the war, Novak had organized at least 260 trains from Germany, Austria and the Protectorate, at least 147 from Hungary, 87 from the Netherlands, 76 from France, 63 from Slovakia, 27 from Belgium, 23 from Greece, 11 from Italy, 7 from Bulgaria and 6 from Croatia — more than 707 from western and southern Europe.

=== Post-war ===
In 1945, Franz Novak disappeared under a false name. After the War Crimes Act and Verbotsgesetz 1947 (Prohibition Act 1947) had been repealed in 1957, Novak resumed his real name. In the course of investigations of the Adolf Eichmann case, the prosecutor of Frankfurt, Fritz Bauer, issued arrest warrants in 1961 against Eichmann's former employees, including Novak. Novak was arrested on 20 January 1961 in Vienna at his place of work, managing a print shop. During interrogation, he denied responsibility for the deportation of Jews. He said at his trial in 1964: "For me, Auschwitz was just a train station." Ella Lingens-Reiner, Hermann Langbein and Franz Danimann testified against him and his transgressions against humanity at Auschwitz. On 17 December 1964, the jury, however, did not convict Novak for aiding and abetting murder, but sentenced him instead to eight years in prison only because of Article 87 of the Austrian penal code known as the "Railroad Act". According to the Railroad Act Novak was committing the criminal offense of intentionally compromising the integrity of railroad passengers during transport by not providing adequate water, food and toilet facilities. The conviction was overturned by the Supreme Court of Austria on a technicality, and a retrial was ordered. On 6 September 1966, at his second trial, the jury ruled that Novak acted under superior orders, and was therefore acquitted. The Supreme Court overturned this ruling once more and ordered a third trial. Novak was finally found guilty on 18 December 1969 and sentenced to nine years of imprisonment. The verdict was appealed, during which time Novak was allowed to live freely. On 13 April 1972, the Supreme Court sentenced him to seven years in prison, once again under Article 87 "Railroad Act". However, Novak, who had been released from jail in 1966 after five years, was informed that the remainder of his now 7-year sentence no longer had to be completed. Instead, Novak was granted a pardon by Austrian President Rudolf Kirchschläger. Simon Wiesenthal later calculated that Novak spent three minutes and twenty seconds in custody for each of his 1.7 million victim whom he sent to his or her death at Auschwitz. An act that Novak admitted to freely but that the Austrian judicial system did not see nearly as crucial in the murder machine as Simon Wiesenthal and others saw it

== Bibliography ==
- Kurt Pätzold, Erika Schwarz: "Auschwitz war für mich nur ein Bahnhof". Franz Novak - der Transportoffizier Adolf Eichmanns, Metropol Verlag, Berlin 1994. ISBN 3-926893-22-2
- Berndt Rieger: Der Fahrdienstleiter des Todes. Franz Novak, der Transportexperte Eichmanns; eine Biographie, Verlag Books on Demand GmbH, Norderstedt 2001. ISBN 3-8311-2541-4
- Donald M. McKale: Nazis after Hitler: How perpetrators of the Holocaust cheated justice and truth. Lanham, Md.: Rowman & Littlefield, 2012 ISBN 978-1-4422-1316-6 S. 291-296
