= Theresienstadt (1944 film) =

1940s German propaganda film

- Directed by: Kurt Gerron; Karel Pečený, under supervision of Hans Günther and Karl Rahm
- Written by: Kurt Gerron using a draft by Jindřich Weil
- Produced by: Karel Pečený (Aktualita Prag)
- Starring: Theresienstadt prisoners
- Cinematography: Ivan Frič; Čeněk Zahradníček
- Edited by: Ivan Frič
- Music by: Various pieces by Jewish composers selected by Peter Deutsch
- Distributed by: Schutzstaffel
- Release date: 1945 (unreleased)
- Running time: c. 90 minutes (surviving footage: 20 minutes)
- Country: Nazi Germany
- Language: German
- Budget: 35,000 Reichsmarks

Theresienstadt. Ein Dokumentarfilm aus dem jüdischen Siedlungsgebiet ("Theresienstadt: A Documentary Film from the Jewish Settlement Area"), unofficially Der Führer schenkt den Juden eine Stadt ("The Führer Gives a City to the Jews"), is a black-and-white projected Nazi propaganda film. It was directed by the German Jewish prisoner Kurt Gerron and the Czech filmmaker Karel Pečený under close SS supervision in the Theresienstadt concentration camp, and edited by Pečený's company, Aktualita. Filmed mostly in the autumn of 1944, it was completed on 28 March 1945 and screened privately four times. After the war, the film was lost but about twenty minutes of footage was later rediscovered in various archives.

Unlike other Nazi propaganda films, which were under the control of Joseph Goebbels' Ministry of Propaganda, Theresienstadt was conceived and paid for by the Jewish Affairs department of the Protectorate of Bohemia and Moravia at the initiative of Hans Günther. The film, which displayed supposedly happy and healthy Jews, was part of a larger Nazi program to use Theresienstadt as a tool to discredit reports of the genocide of Jews reaching the Western Allies and neutral countries. However, it was not widely distributed and did not have the opportunity to influence public opinion.

== Background ==
Theresienstadt was a Nazi ghetto in the Protectorate of Bohemia and Moravia—the German-occupied Czech lands—built inside a repurposed fortified town, now known as Terezín. Between 1941 and 1945, some 140,000 Jews were transported to the camp. Before the war, it housed about 7,000 people; during the camp's existence, the average population was about 45,000. About 33,000 died at Theresienstadt and almost 90,000 were deported to ghettos, extermination camps, and other killing centres, where they faced almost certain death.

In 1942, a Nazi propaganda film was filmed at Theresienstadt. Unlike other Nazi propaganda films, the initiative came from Hans Günther, director of the SS Central Office for the Settlement of the Jewish Question in Bohemia and Moravia, a section of the Reich Security Main Office, rather than the Reich Ministry of Propaganda of Joseph Goebbels. This was the result of a power struggle between Reichsprotektor Reinhard Heydrich and Goebbels; Heydrich won the concession that all propaganda produced in the Protectorate would be run through a special office in the Protectorate administration. The film was probably written by Irena Dodalová, a Czech Jewish prisoner who had run a film studio in Prague with her husband before the war. Little is known about it, since it is little mentioned in the memoirs and testimonies of Theresienstadt survivors, and was only rediscovered in fragmentary form in 1994.

In an attempt to preserve its credibility and preeminence as a humanitarian organization while reports on the mass extermination of Jews continued to reach the Western Allies, the International Committee of the Red Cross (ICRC) requested to visit Theresienstadt in November 1943. On 23 June 1944, Maurice Rossel, an ICRC delegate, and two Danish officials went on a tour of Theresienstadt. In preparation for the visit, the Germans "beautified" and cleaned the camp prior to arrival and arranged cultural activities to give the appearance of a happy, industrious community. To cover up the endemic overpopulation of the camp, thousands of people were deported to Auschwitz before the arrival of the Red Cross delegation. In his report, Rossel claimed that Jews were treated well and not deported from Theresienstadt. (Note: However, the Red Cross had access to independent information that Jews were being deported from Theresienstadt to Auschwitz, and murdered there.) Rossel gave copies of photographs he took during the visit to the German Foreign Ministry, which used them to claim that Jews were treated well under Nazi rule.

== Filming ==
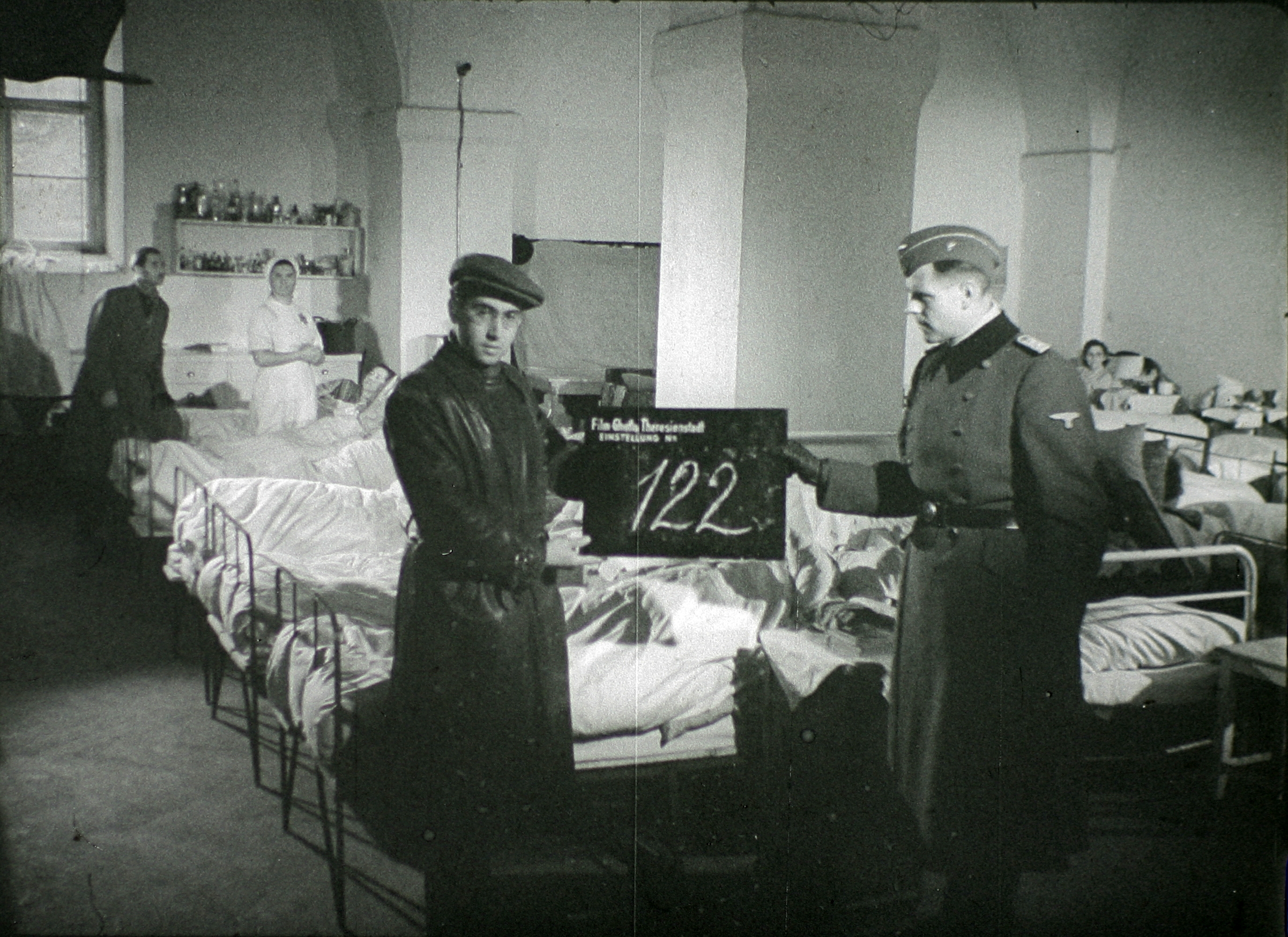
Shooting the Dodalova film (1942)

Preparations for a second Theresienstadt film, again sponsored by Günther rather than Goebbels, began concurrently with the "beautification" of the ghetto prior to the Red Cross visit. Günther's Central Office, which was funded by stolen Jewish property, paid a Czech company, Aktualita, 350,000 Czech koruna (35,000 Reichsmarks) to produce the film. In December 1943, a prisoner, probably Jindřich Weil, was ordered to write a script, and he finished two drafts by March. (Note: The papers, which are neither signed nor dated, were found after the war in the archive of Jindřich Weil (1916–1945), a German-speaking Jew from Prague. Before the war, he had worked as a cameraman and scriptwriter at a film studio, and he had collaborated with Dodalová on the 1942 film. Both drafts contain words and phrases characteristic of Theresienstadt prisoners and of the German-speaking Jewish community in Prague. The last draft included much more narration than is typical in films and was written in bland Nazi official language uncharacteristic of Weil's prior work. Karel Margry hypothesizes that Rahm had a strong influence on this draft. Based on references to events in the scripts, Margry was able to date each draft to a close time interval: the first was written between the end of December and before 14 January, while the second dates to between 26 February and the end of March. Weil's involvement with the film ended with the completion of the second draft.) On 20 January 1944, the Nazis filmed the arrival of a transport of Danish Jews and a welcome speech by Paul Eppstein, with a view of including it in a later film. There was no effort to complete the film before the Red Cross visit and screen it to the guests. Karel Margry, a Dutch historian who has studied the Theresienstadt propaganda films, argues that the "beautification" efforts had a higher priority, and that the propaganda would be more effective if filmed after the ghetto had been beautified.

Kurt Gerron, a leading German Jewish actor and director, had fled to the Netherlands and was deported from Westerbork to Theresienstadt in February 1944. In July, the film project was revived and Gerron was ordered to write a script, which was used in the film. While the script has traditionally been credited to Gerron, it closely adhered to Weil's draft and the dictates of the SS; his creative role was minimal. Although he is usually credited with directorship of the film, Gerron's role in the filming was more symbolic than substantial, according to Spanish film historian Rafael de España. Eyewitnesses report that Gerron was constantly urging Jews to behave as mirthfully as the Germans wished and organizing mass scenes. However, SS men oversaw the filming, and Rahm and even Günther supervised scenes. When Rahm was not present on set, Gerron had to send him detailed reports.

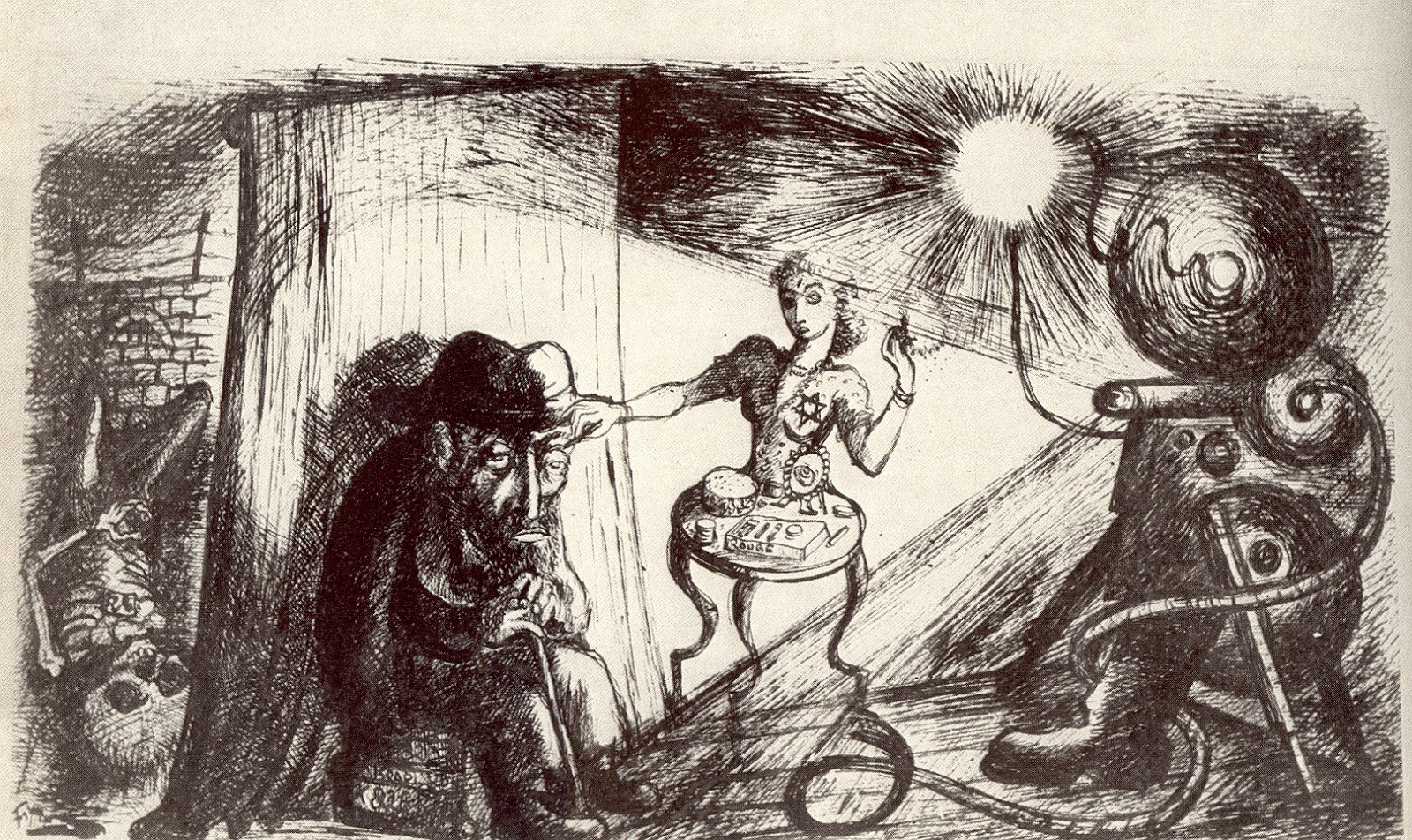
Bedřich Fritta's caricature of the filming.

Filming took place over eleven days between 16 August and 11 September 1944. The assistant directors were František Zelenka, Jo Spier, and Hans Hofer. Karel Pečený and his company Aktualita provided the cameramen, and halfway through filming, Pečený effectively took over as director. The two cameramen were Ivan Frič and Čeněk Zahradníček, assisted by Benda Rosenwein. The film's soundtrack has been credited to Jaroslav Sechura and Josef Francek. Aktualita collaborated with the German newsreel company Favoritfilm in producing the film. Prisoners of stereotypically Jewish appearance who were not obviously malnourished were chosen to appear in the film. They were given time off work for rehearsals and filming, and those unwilling to appear were threatened with harsh punishment.

On 28 October, Gerron was deported to Auschwitz, where he was murdered, never seeing even a preliminary version of the film. The film was cut by Ivan Frič, who did not use Gerron's proposals for cutting or any of the scripts, but instead using the same improvised technique that he used for Aktualita's weekly newsreels. Frič had to cut the ending three times before Günther accepted it. The final cut bore little resemblance to Gerron's July script, his later editing proposal, or his creative vision for the film. In March, Aktualita sent a crew to the camp in order to collect some samples of "Jewish music", including snippets of the work of Felix Mendelssohn, Jacques Offenbach, and the children's opera Brundibár by Theresienstadt prisoner Hans Krása. The music was performed under the direction of Danish Jewish composer Peter Deutsch, who had experience with film soundtracks before the war. The SS completed the film on 28 March 1945, in time to present to the ICRC delegation that arrived on 6 April 1945.

== Content ==
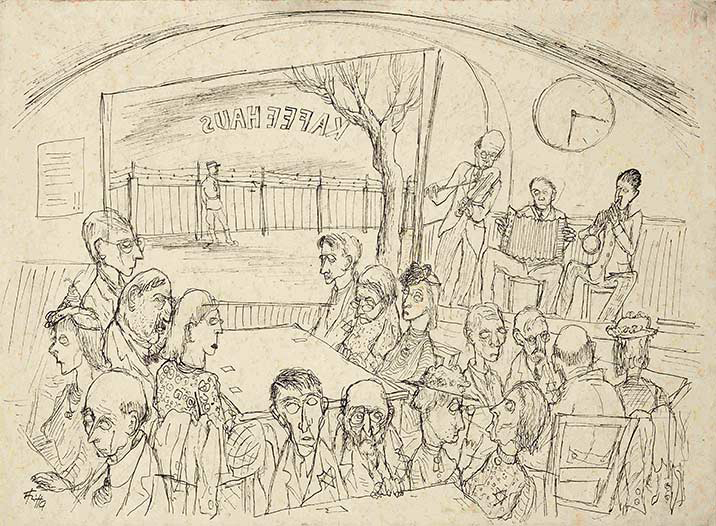
Fritta's drawing of the sham coffeehouse in the film

Testimonies agree that the film ran about 90 minutes, the standard length. Survivors remember what was filmed, but not which scenes were used in the final version. Although the full film was lost, a surviving document from the editing stage lists all the sequences as they appeared in the final version, and from surviving fragments and the drawings of Jo Spier, historians have "a very good idea of the visual image of virtually every scene in the film's 38 sequences", according to Margry. Nothing survives of a scene showing the self-government's court and a different scene in a dining hall.

The film opens with the children's choir, directed by Karel Fischer, singing Mendelssohn's oratorio, Elijah. The Ghetto Swingers, a jazz band, plays outside, and "prominent" prisoners enjoy food and beverages on a terrace and in a sham coffee house. Various sports events are also performed. The first eight sequences of the film show only leisure activities, setting the tone for the rest of the film and casting Theresienstadt as a holiday resort. Later sections of the film focus on work, including the Jewish self-government, construction projects, craft workshops, and agriculture. H. G. Adler notes that the type of work depicted in the film was not typical of that performed by most prisoners. Fake institutions, such as a bank and various shops, are also shown. Theresienstadt medical care, including a hospital and recuperation home, makes an appearance. Family life and unstructured leisure time is depicted towards the end of the film. The final scene is of a performance of the children's opera Brundibár.

Karl Rahm insisted that the "prominent" prisoners of Theresienstadt be filmed, and pressed Gerron to include more of them in his shots. Among the "prominents" who appeared were Jo Spier, Max Friediger, Paul Eppstein, and Leo Baeck. The SS also insisted that the film's soundtrack consist exclusively of Jewish composers. (Note: A list of composers and works: Felix Mendelssohn (Elias, A Midsummer Night's Dream, violin concerto); Sholom Secunda (Bei Mir Bistu Shein); Hans Krása (Brundibár); Jacques Offenbach (The Tales of Hoffmann, La Vie parisienne); Pavel Haas ("Studie für Streichorchester"); Max Bruch; Dol Dauber) According to España, the film itself is of good technical quality, and the focus on leisure activities creates an "atmosphere of a perpetual party". (Note: Spanish: ambiente de fiesta perpetua) Margry states that the narration was "the main truth-distorting element", but nevertheless included some factual information. According to Margry, historians have exaggerated the falseness of the film. Although Theresienstadt as a whole is "a vicious work of propaganda", "the visual authenticity" of the film is greater than many commentators have written, and the film accurately depicts some elements of daily life in the ghetto. Margry argues that "the film's blatant dishonesty turns on what it did not show: the hunger, the misery, the overcrowding, the slave work for the German war economy, the high death rate, and, most of all, the transports leaving for the East".

== Aftermath ==
The film was not intended to be shown in Germany; the Nazi propagandists hoped to distribute it in neutral countries to counter Allied news reports about the persecution of Jews. However, by the time the film was completed on 28 March 1945, Germany's imminent defeat made this impossible. An alternative interpretation was that by the time it was completed, the film was intended for a much more select audience and narrowly focused on the cinematic portrayal of "prominent" prisoners who had in fact been murdered at Auschwitz in order to persuade the ICRC that they were still alive. Because of this more select audience, Czech film historian Natascha Drubek argues that the film was not propaganda in a true sense.

The film is known to have been screened at least three times. According to Margry, in late March or early April at Czernin Palace in Prague, the film was shown privately to a few high-ranking SS officers, including Higher SS and Police Leader for the Protectorate, Karl Hermann Frank, as well as Günther and Rahm. It was shown at Theresienstadt on 6 April to a Red Cross delegation including Otto Lehner and Paul Dunant, accompanied by Swiss diplomat Buchmüller; Frank's subordinate Erwin Weinmann was also present. Pointing to testimony that Rahm was bedridden with fever on 6 April, Drubek argues that these two screenings were in fact the same, and that Lehner and Dunant saw the film on 6 April at Czernin Palace with Frank, but not Rahm, in attendance.

On 16 April the film was shown twice at Theresienstadt, first to Benoît Musy, son of Jean-Marie Musy, a Swiss politician and negotiator with Himmler, in the company of SS officer Franz Göring. After Musy left, the film was shown to Rudolf Kastner, chairman of the Hungarian Jewish Aid and Rescue Committee; Kastner was escorted by two members of Eichmann's staff. Günther, his deputy Gerhard Günel, Rahm, and Jewish elder Benjamin Murmelstein were also present. All of those who viewed the film had access to independent reports that hundreds of thousands of Jews were being murdered at Auschwitz and there is no indication that any of them were affected by the film. At Pečený's recommendation, the SS deposited 25 crates of film footage in Favoritfilm's warehouse in Holešovice shortly before the Prague uprising broke out. The warehouse was damaged by an incendiary bomb on 7 May. Eva Strusková suggests that Günther may have ordered the film to be destroyed. There is no proof that Theresienstadt was in the warehouse, so it is possible that the film was otherwise lost.

== Historiography ==
In the postwar era, the film was considered lost, but continued to be the focus of discussion. The RSHA archives were burned in 1945, so the Nazis' paperwork relating to Theresienstadt was also destroyed. Less than 25 minutes of footage were later discovered in various archives. Allegedly, Přemysl Schönbach discovered fragments of the film in Mšeno in May or June 1945. He kept them in a private archive, but showed them to Vladimír Kressl, a lecturer at the Film and TV School of the Academy of Performing Arts in Prague in 1964, which resulted in a copy of the footage being deposited into the Czechoslovak national archives that same year. Also in 1964, Schönbach provided a copy to Michael Bornkamp, a West German journalist, who subsequently used the footage in a documentary So schön war es in Terezin (It was so nice in Terezín), which was screened at the 1965 Oberhausen Film Festival. Schönbach was sentenced to a three-year suspended sentence for causing financial loss to the Czechoslovak nation. Natascha Drubek introduces a different perspective on the politically motivated use of 'found' or 'discovered' Nazi film fragments in Communist Czechoslovakia, relating it to attempts to influence West-German politics during the Cold War, so the statute of limitations for acts of murder during the war would not end in 1965.

In 1965, the Czechoslovak authorities made their own documentary based on the footage, Město darované (The Given Town), which is still used by the Terezín Ghetto Museum today. Fragments of the footage including the title sequence were discovered in a former Gestapo building in Prague by former prisoner Jiří Lauscher at an unknown date and transferred to an Israeli archive, where they were rediscovered in 1987. A speech made by Paul Eppstein was discovered in Prague in 1997. The Israeli footage was broken into 24 fragments, the shortest of which was only one frame and the longest of which was two minutes. Another important source of information on what was filmed is the sketches of Jo Spier, a Dutch Jewish illustrator who observed the filming and made 332 sketches of scenes from the camera's viewpoint. Although some critics have assumed that his sketches were made before filming, this is not the case.

According to Kurt Gerron's papers, the original title was Die jüdische Selbstverwaltung in Theresienstadt (The Jewish Self-Government in Theresienstadt); later, he used the short title Theresienstadt. Excerpts of the film discovered in the Israeli archive in 1988 revealed the official title to be Theresienstadt, with the subtitle Ein Dokumentarfilm aus dem jüdischen Siedlungsgebiet (A Documentary Film from the Jewish Settlement Area). According to Margry, the Nazis called it a "documentary film" in order to cast the film as an authentic representation of Theresienstadt life rather than staged propaganda, while the last three words imply that there were more "Jewish settlements" like Theresienstadt. It is believed that Jewish prisoners gave the film an ironic title, Der Führer schenkt den Juden eine Stadt, ("The Führer Gives a City to the Jews"), during the final months of the war, which was used as the title until 1988. (Note: Margry argues that the Nazis would never have given the film that title, because it implies that Hitler made a personal gesture of generosity towards the Jews. At Karl Rahm's 1947 trial, the title was initially given as the correct Theresienstadt but later changed to Der Führer schenkt den Juden eine Stadt after Jewish witnesses had testified.) The misconception about the correct title has been used in a number of analyses of Nazi propaganda by film critics.

Film historians have often claimed that the film was ordered by Goebbels, but that is not the case. Many scholars have claimed that the film was ordered after the June Red Cross visit, but it was prepared from late 1943. The earlier origin of the film discredits many theories that have been offered for why the Nazis ordered the film. (Note: 1. The successful D-Day landings in Normandy and subsequent threat of German military defeat; 2. The deception of Maurice Rossel and the Red Cross delegation on 23 June; 3. Discovery around 17 July 1944 that several Theresienstadt artists had smuggled images accurately depicting the camp's conditions out; 4. Soviet liberation of Majdanek extermination camp on 24 July 1944; 5. Negotiations between Eichmann and Joel Brand and Saly Mayer for the rescue of Jews, beginning in April 1944 (Brand) and August (Mayer)) It has also been claimed that Heinrich Himmler was closely involved in the production of the film and showed it to the Western Allied agents with whom he was conducting secret negotiations in late 1944. However, the only evidence suggesting that he knew of the film's existence is a letter between his secretary, Rudolf Brandt, and personal masseur, Felix Kersten, in March or April 1945.

== Legacy ==
The German film website filmportal.de describes the film as "one of the most cynical and despicable Nazi propaganda films". In a review of the 2002 Canadian documentary Prisoner of Paradise, which focused on Gerron's role in the film, Entertainment Weekly states that the 1944 film was "a work of propaganda so perverse one is shocked to realize that even the Nazis could have thought of it". For many years, it was assumed that the participants in the film were collaborators, and they were judged very harshly. Karel Pečený was convicted of collaborationism in 1947 and sentenced to five years' imprisonment, ten years' loss of civil rights, and the nationalization of his company and other assets. Later appraisal has tempered this assessment. Margry states that Aktualita's participation was probably coerced by the SS. He notes that Frič smuggled still images out of the studio at considerable personal risk and Pečený risked his life by delaying the completion of the film until after it was no longer useful to Günther. The film has been used by Holocaust deniers to make false generalizations about the treatment of Jews by the Nazi regime.
