= Central Office for Jewish Emigration in Prague =

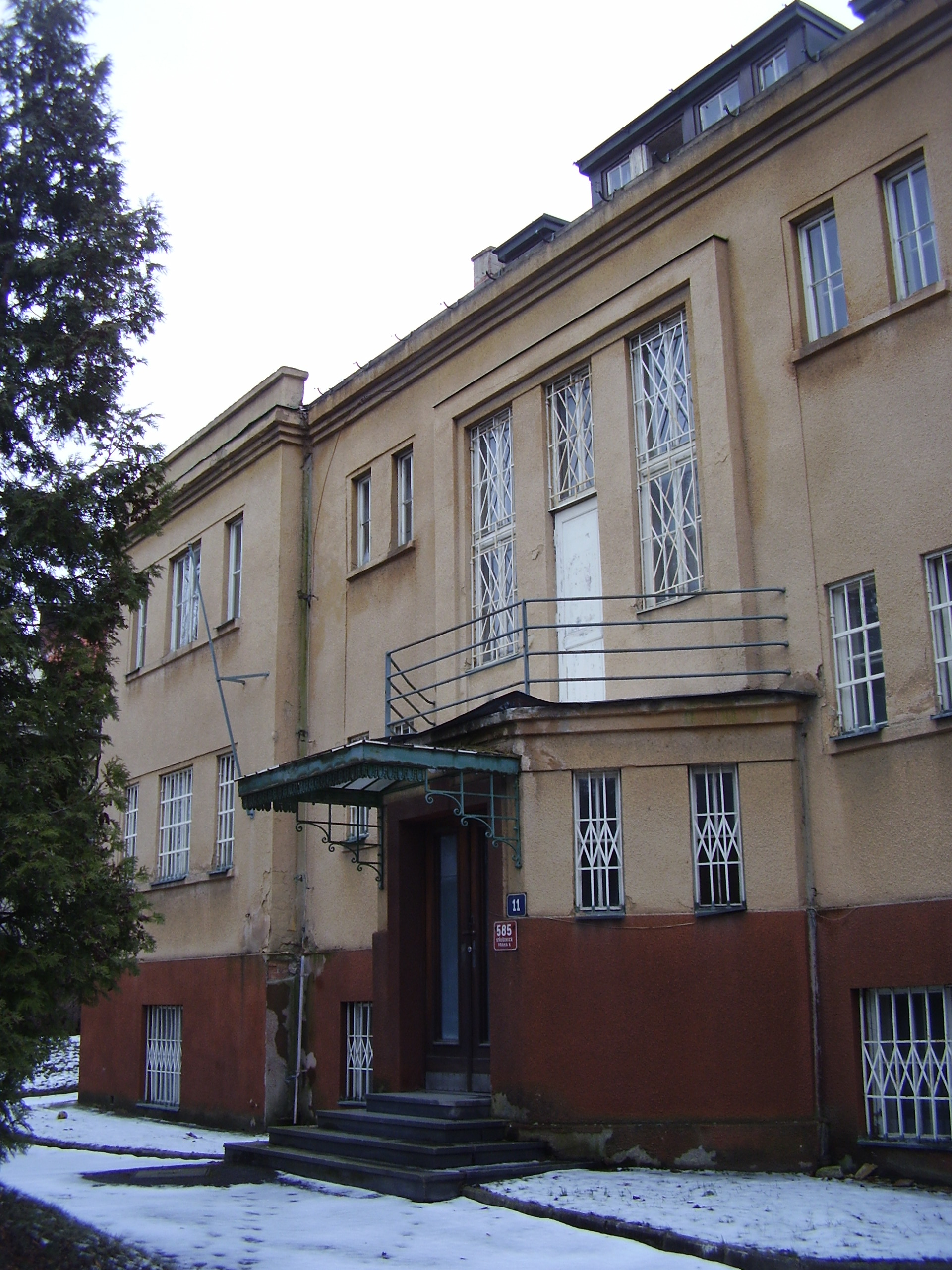
Central Office for Jewish Emigration in Prague

The Central Office for Jewish Emigration in Prague (German: Zentralstelle für jüdische Auswanderung in Prag), reformed in 1942 as the (German: Zentralamt für die Regelung der Judenfrage in Böhmen und Mähren), was part of the Central Office for Jewish Emigration.

== Sources ==
- Milotová, Jaroslava (1997). "Die Zentralstelle für jüdische Auswanderung in Prag; Genesis und Tätigkeit bis zum Anfang des Jahres 1940". Theresienstädter Studien und Dokumente (in German) (4): 7–30. CEEOL 155846.
- Jančík, Drahomír; Kubů, Eduard; Novotný, Jiří; Šouša, Jiří (2001). "Der Mechanismus der Enteignung jüdischen Goldes im «Protektorat Böhmen und Mähren» und seine Funktionsweise (1939—1945)". Zeitschrift für Unternehmensgeschichte. 46 (1): 58–76. doi:10.1515/zug-2001-0104. S2CID 188370539.
- Gruner, Wolf (2019). The Holocaust in Bohemia and Moravia: Czech Initiatives, German Policies, Jewish Responses. Berghahn Books. doi:10.2307/j.ctv1850gjq. ISBN 978-1-78920-285-4. S2CID 241797317.
- Osterloh, Jörg (2000). "Die "Arisierung" jüdischen Vermögens in Böhmen und Mähren" [The "Aryanization" of Jewish property in Bohemia and Moravia]. Bohemia. 41 (2): 422–426. doi:10.18447/BoZ-2000-556.
