= Rolf Günther =

Nazi German functionary, deputy to Adolf Eichmann (1913–1945)

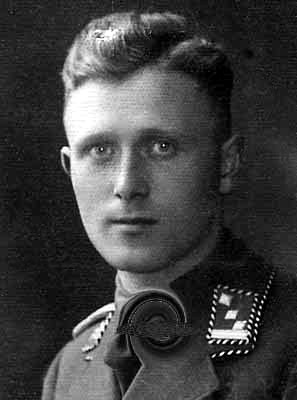
Rolf Günther as an SS-Hauptsturmführer

Rolf Günther (8 January 1913 – August 1945) was a German functionary who served in the Schutzstaffel (SS) as a Sturmbannführer and who acted as deputy to Adolf Eichmann. He first joined the Sturmabteilung (SA) in 1929 and became dedicated to the Nazi cause.

Günther was responsible for the deportation of Jews from Salonika to Auschwitz concentration camp, with assistance from Alois Brunner. His brother Hans Günther was head of the Central Office for Jewish Emigration in Prague.

Günther committed suicide by poison in August 1945 while being held by the Americans in an Ebensee prison, however Adolf Eichmann believed him to have definitely survived the war and made his way to an unknown location overseas.

== Sources ==
- Cesarani, David (2005) [2004]. Eichmann: His Life and Crimes. London: Vintage. ISBN 978-0-09-944844-0.
