= Čeněk Zahradníček =

Czech film director, cinematographer, and editor

- Born: 11 April 1900
- Died: 12 November 1989 (aged 89); Prague, Czechoslovakia
- Occupation: Cinematographer

Čeněk Zahradníček (11 April 1900 – 12 November 1989) was a Czech experimental film director, cinematographer and editor.

== Life and work ==
He was one of the founders of the Prague Pathé Club. He started as an amateur filmmaker shooting on 9.5mm film camera. In the 1920s and 1930s he made his short independent movies influenced by avantgarde filmmakers. His film A Soldier's Story (1934) won the UNICA main prize for the best amateur film. His film May was intended as a backdrop for an E. F. Burian's theatre performance based on poem of the same name by Karel Hynek Mácha.

In 1937 he became a professional cinematographer shooting newsreels. In 1942 while working under German occupation he had to shoot a newsreel about the Lidice massacre. In 1944 he was a cinematographer for a German propaganda film Theresienstadt. Because of this he had to leave his cinematographer job in 1948 and worked in an archive until his retirement.

== Filmography ==
- Caliber 32W (1926) - Inspired by the work of Jack London
- A Soldier's Story (1934) - Co-directed with Vladimír Šmejkal
- The Atom of Eternity (1934) - Co-directed with Vladimír Šmejkal
- Hands on Tuesday (1935) - Co-directed with Vladimír Šmejkal
- May (1936) - Co-directed with E. F. Burian
- Spring Awakening (1936) - Co-directed with E. F. Burian
