= Central Office for Jewish Emigration =

Nazi government agency

Reich Central Office for Jewish Emigration
- Reichszentrale für jüdische Auswanderung
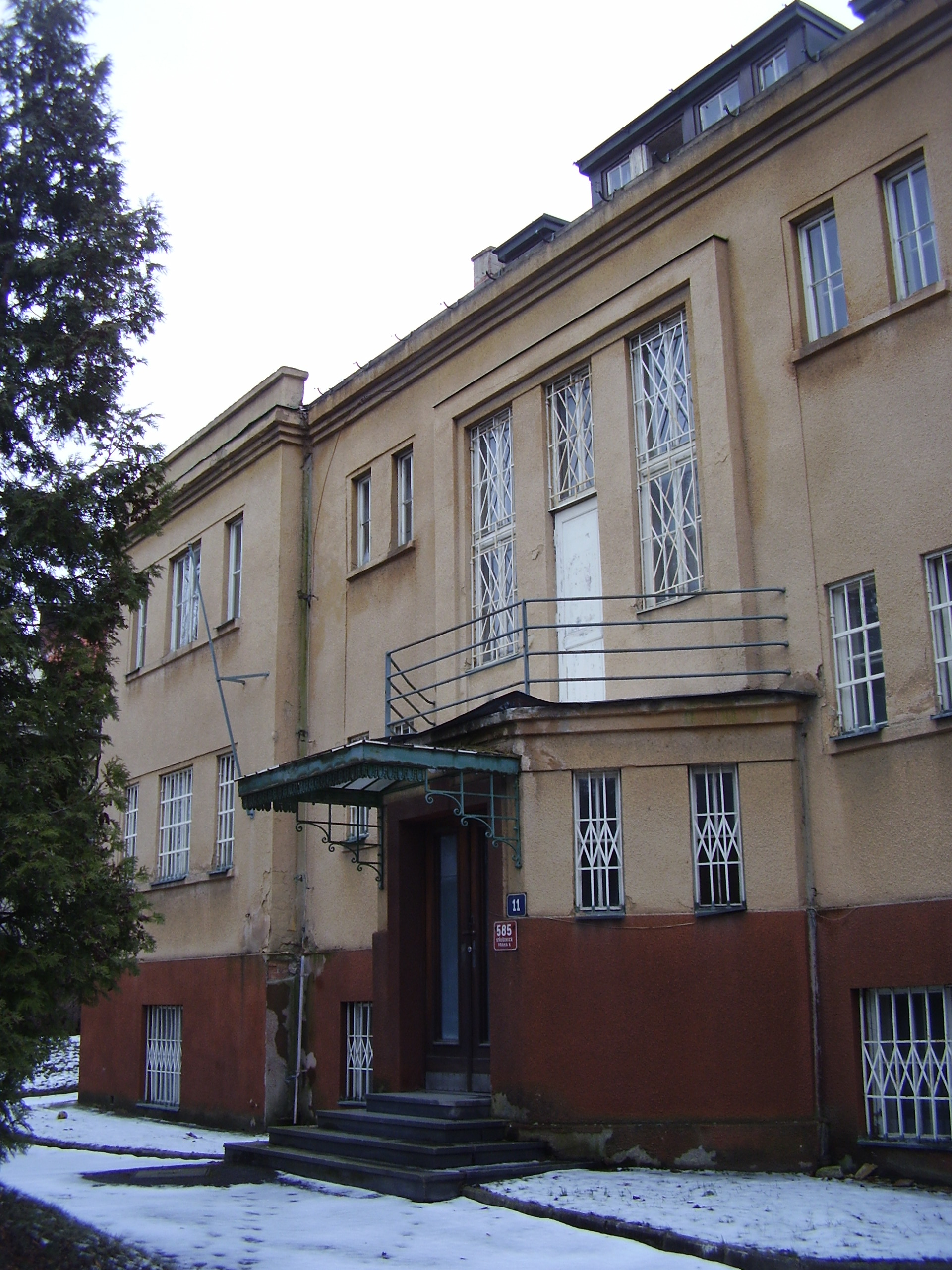
- Central Office for Jewish Emigration in Prague

Agency overview
- Formed: 24 January 1939
- Dissolved: 1945
- Jurisdiction: Nazi Germany
- Headquarters: Kurfürstenstraße, 115/116, Berlin
- Agency executives: Reinhard Heydrich, Director; Heinrich Müller (1939) Adolf Eichmann (from October 1939), Manager (Geschäftsführer)
- Parent department: Reich Ministry of the Interior (nominal); Reichssicherheitshauptamt (de facto from 1941)

Central Office for Jewish Emigration (German: Zentralstelle für jüdische Auswanderung) was a designation of Nazi institutions in Vienna, Prague and Amsterdam. Their head office, the Reich Central Office for Jewish Emigration (Reichszentrale für jüdische Auswanderung), was based in Berlin. Their purpose was to expel Jews from Nazi-controlled areas.

== History ==
The office in Vienna, created in the former Palais Albert Rothschild at Prinz-Eugen-Straße 20-22, was founded in August of 1938 by Adolf Eichmann. He began the office as a way of getting around the red tape the Jews of Austria faced when trying to leave the country.

Every organization, public or private, which was associated with emigration was required to have a representative at the Central Office. The Central Office answered to the Sicherheitsdienst (Security Service; SD) office in Berlin.

The Central Office paid for the emigration of the Jews by taking money from wealthier Jews and using it to expel their fellows.

Following the Vienna branch, Eichmann opened another branch in Prague. Eventually, Eichmann set up a Central Office so that all arrangements for emigration could be made in one location. On 24 January 1939, the Reich Central Office for Jewish Emigration (Reichszentrale für jüdische Auswanderung) was established in Berlin by Hermann Göring with Reinhard Heydrich at the head. It was charged with the task of using all available means to prompt Jews to emigrate, and of establishing a Jewish organization that would incorporate all of German Jewry and co-ordinate emigration from the Jewish side.
