= The Holocaust in Bohemia and Moravia (book) =

Book by Wolf Gruner

- First edition (German)
- Author: Wolf Gruner
- Original title: Judenverfolgung im Protektorat Böhmen und Mähren. Lokale Initiativen, zentrale Entscheidungen, jüdische Antworten
- Translator: Alex Skinner
- Language: German
- Subject: The Holocaust in Bohemia and Moravia
- Genre: Non-fiction
- Publisher: Wallstein Verlag (de); Berghahn Books (en)
- Publication date: 2016
- English publication date: 2019

The Holocaust in Bohemia and Moravia: Czech Initiatives, German Policies, Jewish Responses (German: Judenverfolgung im Protektorat Böhmen und Mähren. Lokale Initiativen, zentrale Entscheidungen, jüdische Antworten, "Persecution of Jews in the Protectorate of Bohemia and Moravia: Local Initiatives, Central Decisions, Jewish Responses") is a book by the German historian Wolf Gruner on the Holocaust in Bohemia and Moravia, the Czech-majority parts of Czechoslovakia partially annexed into Nazi Germany during the German occupation of Czechoslovakia. Beginning before the Munich Agreement, Gruner's book covers the various stages of persecution of Jews which led to their deportation and murder. He argues that the role of Czech collaboration and local initiatives was greater than has been conventionally assumed, and also that Jewish resistance to persecution was substantial. The book has received mixed reviews; some Czech historians have disagreed with Gruner's conclusions while other reviewers generally praised the book with some reservations. The book was published in German in 2016 and in English and Czech in 2019. It received the 2017 Sybil Halpern Milton Memorial Book Prize of the German Studies Association.

== Publication history ==
The book was first published in German as Die Judenverfolgung im Protektorat Böhmen und Mähren. Lokale Initiativen, zentrale Entscheidungen, jüdische Antworten 1939–1945 ("The Persecution of Jews in the Protectorate of Bohemia and Moravia. Local initiatives, central decisions, Jewish responses 1939–1945") in 2016, by Wallstein Verlag. An English translation by Alex Skinner, The Holocaust in Bohemia and Moravia: Czech Initiatives, German Policies, Jewish Responses was published by Berghahn Books in 2019, as part of the "War and Genocide" series. A Czech translation was also published by Academia in 2019, and a Hebrew translation is planned as of 2020. The author, Wolf Gruner, is a German historian who holds the Shapell-Guerin Chair in Jewish Studies at the University of Southern California, where he founded the Center for Advanced Genocide Research at the USC Shoah Foundation.

== Contents ==
Organized in chronological order, the book starts with a chapter on the situation of minorities in Czechoslovakia, in which Gruner argues against the common perception that the First Czechoslovak Republic was less antisemitic than neighboring countries. He concludes that genuine persecution of the Jews began after the Munich Agreement in the Second Czechoslovak Republic. The book continues into the annexation of the Czech lands into Nazi Germany as the Protectorate of Bohemia and Moravia, early measures taken by the Czech and German authorities, and how the war affected long-term German deportation plans. Subsequent chapters address the gradual persecution and ghettoization of Jews, resistance of Czechs and Jews to anti-Jewish decrees, central versus local anti-Jewish measures, forced labor, the robbery of Jewish property (Aryanization), deportation, and finally the fate of those left behind after the deportations slowed.

Previously, researchers had not paid much attention to the Holocaust in Bohemia and Moravia because they assumed that it follows the same pattern as the Holocaust in Germany and Austria. Gruner argues that this was not the case. In particular, he emphasizes the decentralization of decision-making in the early stages of the Holocaust, including a greater role for the Czech collaborationist government. He also emphasizes the drafting of Jews from the Protectorate for forced labor, which had been overlooked by earlier studies. Unlike previous works on the same topic, such as H. G. Adler's Theresienstadt 1941–1945, Gruner focuses on the persecution of Jews outside of Theresienstadt Ghetto rather than centering the book around the ghetto. Gruner contends that contrary to portrayals of Jews as passive victims, most actually tried to resist persecution. He highlights the role of the Prague Jewish Community, which tried to exploit the weaknesses in the system of competing anti-Jewish agencies while providing welfare to persecuted Jews, and individual Jews who took various actions from emigration to joining organized resistance groups.

== Reception ==
Czech historian Vojtěch Blodig gave the book a critical review in Judaica Bohemiae. According to Blodig, the overall picture that Gruner presented is inaccurate and overestimates Czech collaborationism, although he conceded that Gruner's research was extensive. Michal Frankl concurs, criticizing the "selective use of sources"—Gruner did not do enough research in Czech archives, in his opinion—which led the book to conclusions he considered erroneous.

The German historian Stefan Dölling was somewhat critical of Gruner's work for being too vague on concrete examples to support his conclusions, and putting too much emphasis on the Czech fascist faction whose influence was limited, according to Dölling. Overall, however, he considered the book "thoroughly solid". German historian René Küpper praised the book, which he says analyzes new sources and fills in previously unknown details about Jewish lives in the Protectorate. Edith Raim gave the book a mostly favorable review and wrote that she considers it the standard work (Standardwerk) for its subject.

In Holocaust and Genocide Studies, Laura Brade gave the book a generally favorable review, writing that it was "an important narrative about the course of the Holocaust in the Bohemian Lands". However, she faulted Gruner for not clearly distinguishing between Reich and native Germans and paying insufficient attention to the fluidity of Czech and German identity in the area. In New Books Network, Kelly McFall praised the book for its coverage of an understudied topic. Writing in Journal of Contemporary European Studies, Stuart Parkes argued that Gruner somewhat exaggerated Czech collaborationism. However, he otherwise praised the "important book" for synthesizing statistical information and personal testimonies and exploring previously unavailable sources. According to UK-based historian Lisa Peschel, the book is "an admirable work of archival research" that "sheds new light on several important questions". The drawback is that Gruner "meticulously researched half the archive", leading to lack of nuance in some of his conclusions about the Czech Protectorate authorities.

== Awards ==
The German version of the book received the 2017 Sybil Halpern Milton Memorial Book Prize of the German Studies Association for the best book in Holocaust Studies in 2015–2016, because "Gruner’s book makes a major contribution to Holocaust research." The book was second place in the Yad Vashem International Book Prize for Holocaust Research, and won one of the prizes for most outstanding German studies in humanities and social sciences in 2017, awarded jointly by the Börsenverein des Deutschen Buchhandels, the Fritz Thyssen Foundation, the Verwertungsgesellschaft Wort and the German Foreign Office.
