= The Greater German Reich and the Jews =

2010 book

The Greater German Reich and the Jews: Nazi Persecution Policies in the Annexed Territories 1935–1945
- First edition (German)
- Author: Nazi Germany
- Publication date: 2010

The Greater German Reich and the Jews: Nazi Persecution Policies in the Annexed Territories 1935–1945 is a book about the Holocaust in areas annexed by Nazi Germany. The book's chapters are arranged in chronological order by annexation date and cover the Saarland, Austria, the Sudetenland, Protectorate of Bohemia and Moravia, Memel Territory, Danzig and West Prussia, the Warthegau, Zichenau, East Upper Silesia, Eupen-Malmedy, Luxembourg, and Alsace-Lorraine. It was first published in German in 2010; an English translation was published in 2015. The book was edited by Jörg Osterloh and Wolf Gruner. The book received generally favorable reviews.

== See also ==
- The Holocaust in the Sudetenland
- The Holocaust in Bohemia and Moravia
- The Holocaust in East Upper Silesia
