= Central Agency for Jewish Emigration in Vienna =

- Zentralstelle für jüdische Auswanderung in Wien

Agency overview
- Formed: May 1938
- Preceding Agency: Jewish Community of Vienna
- Jurisdiction: Austria
- Agency executive: Alois Brunner

The Central Agency for Jewish Emigration in Vienna (German: Zentralstelle für jüdische Auswanderung in Wien) was a Sicherheitsdienst (SD-Security Service) agency established in August 1938 to accelerate the forced emigration of Austrian Jews and (starting in October 1939) to organize and carry out their deportation. The resolution of emigration issues relating to Austrian citizenship, foreign citizens’ rights, foreign currencies and the taxation of assets were coordinated in order to accelerate this emigration process. The Central Agency for Jewish Emigration in Vienna was the only institution empowered with the issuance of exit permits for Jews in Austria from the time of the Anschluss in 1938 until the ban on Jewish emigration in 1941. The Vienna Agency became the prototype for similar SS agencies used to implement the deportation of Jews in Amsterdam, Prague and many other European cities.

== History ==
=== Prewar: Inception and role in forced emigration ===
Adolf Eichmann in 1942.

Adolf Eichmann, who had been sent from Berlin as the head of the Agency, and his associate Alois Brunner, set the emigration quotas, the fulfillment of which was delegated by the Nazi Party to the Israelite Community of Vienna. The Israelite Community had been officially closed by the Nazis in March 1938 and re-opened under the name "Jewish Community of Vienna." Their Nazi-appointed Jewish leader was Josef Löwenherz and the appointed head of the "Emigration Division of the Jewish Community" (German: Auswanderungsabteilung der Kultusgemeinde) was Benjamin Murmelstein. Another important role in the organization was taken by Berthold Storfer. By forcing the Jewish Communities into Nazi-subordinated Judenräte or "Jewish councils," the Nazis were able to coerce the Jewish people into taking an active bureaucratic role in their own destruction.

In the summer of 1938, Löwenherz and co-workers of the Jewish Community of Vienna appealed to Eichmann to simplify the bureaucratic preliminary procedures for those wishing to emigrate. The Reichskommissar responsible for Nazi Austria, Josef Bürckel, subsequently established the Central Agency for Jewish Emigration in Vienna on 20 August 1938, formally under the leadership of Walter Stahlecker, but in reality led by Eichmann. Later Franz Josef Huber, head of the Sicherheitspolizei (SiPo-Security Police) and SD for the Nazi districts of Vienna, Oberdonau and Niederdonau, was given formal leadership of the Central Agency for Jewish Emigration in Vienna. Huber delegated most of his duties to his deputy Karl Ebner, who became known as the “gray eminence” of the Vienna Gestapo in light of his nearly unrestricted police powers. The surviving directives to the Central Agency for Jewish Emigration carry his signature.

In the Central Agency, all essential external governmental agencies were represented which could issue "documents of compliance" (German: Unbedenklichkeitsbescheinigungen) if no arrears were owed for rents, fees, taxes or the racist-motivated "Jewish Capital Levy" (German: Judenvermögensabgabe), and the Reich Flight Tax had been paid. The applicant was processed in an assembly-line manner, so that the "Jews who wished to emigrate were, in a timespan of eight to fourteen days", furnished with all of the necessary paperwork. Eichmann boasted that the number of "Jews forced to emigrate" had been increased to 350 per day; by the end of September 1938, 38,000 Jews had left Austria legally. Reinhard Heydrich stated on 12 November 1938 that the total number had already increased up to 45,000.

The costs of the forced emigration would be paid for by the victims. The Jewish Community of Vienna, which was under strain from the rising amount of tasks from emigration and charity work, and simultaneously operating with reduced financing, had, with the permission of Eichmann, asked the representative of the American Jewish Joint Distribution Committee for financial support. In addition, applicants for emigration were forced to pay an "emigration payment" (German: Auswandererabgabe) on an income-based pay scale in order to cover the travel costs of impoverished Jews. The primary goal of this payment was the Nazi theft of Jewish assets within the guidelines of “aryanization”. Wealthy Jewish citizens received preferential treatment through the Gildemeester Organization. This was not actually intended to bestow any kind of "privilege", but rather used as a pseudo-legal form for the Nazi state to rob Jewish assets directly, in contrast to the standard "aryanization" procedure, whereby mostly individuals with the Nazi Party benefited.

The organization and effectiveness of the Vienna "Central Agency", which was located in the Palais Albert Rothschild, quickly became a model example within the SS for the establishment of the German "Reich Central Agency for Jewish Emigration" (German: Reichszentrale für jüdische Auswanderung) in Berlin. Later, based on the so-called "Vienna Model", Central Agencies for Jewish Emigration were also established in Amsterdam and Prague.

==== Personnel ====
Alois Brunner, although officially named as the leader of the Central Agency in Vienna in January 1941, was already the de facto chief after Eichmann left in 1939. A complete list of personnel from the Central Agency in Vienna has not survived, but the following SS members were among the 17 to 20 co-workers under Alois Brunner:

- Anton Brunner (1898–1946)
- Ernst Brückler (1912–?)
- Anton Burger (1911–1991)
- Ferdinand Daurach (1912–?)
- Herbert Gerbing (1914–?)
- Ernst Girzick (1911–?)
- Richard Hartenberger (1911–1974)
- Franz Novak (1913–1983)
- Karl Rahm (1907–1947)
- Alfred Slawik (1913–after 1962)
- Franz Stuschka (1910–1986)
- Josef Weiszl (1912–after 1956)
- Anton Zita (1909–1946)

=== Wartime: Role in the deportations and dissolution ===
In the period of forced emigration, the Central Agency in Vienna "put into practice an official operation which would later be put into full force with the deportation of the Jews." Although the name of the Agency remained the same, the Central Agency for Jewish Emigration in Vienna organized and implemented the deportation of the Austrian Jews out of Vienna, beginning in October 1939 with the transports to Nisko, Poland, and then in February and March 1941 with the deportation over 5,000 Jews from Vienna to ghettos in small Polish towns such as Opole und Kielce. As the practice of state-sponsored exit visas came to a halt with Heinrich Himmler’s ban on Jewish emigration on 18 October 1941, the Central Agency accelerated the deportations, until by the end of 1942, the “Jewish question” in Vienna had been practically "solved." Of the (by definition of the racist Nuremberg Laws) 206,000 Jews who had lived in Austria in 1938, only around 8,000 were left. The personnel of the Central Agency for Jewish Emigration in Vienna were directly responsible for the deportation of at least 48,767 Austrian Jews who were murdered.

The Central Agency for Jewish Emigration in Vienna continued to operate until its dissolution in March 1943. Later deportations of Jewish victims from Vienna were carried out by the Gestapo. Some of the personnel in the Vienna Central Agency later transferred to the Central Agency for Jewish Emigration in Prague.

=== Postwar: Justice, a "sensational discovery" and the documents' whereabouts ===
The postwar biographies of the personnel of the Central Agency of Vienna are very diverse: some were brought to justice, with punishments ranging from relatively mild prison sentences (Ernst Girzick, Richard Hartenberger, Franz Novak, Alfred Slawik, Franz Stuschka, Josef Weiszl) to death sentences for Anton Brunner, Adolf Eichmann and Karl Rahm. Ernst Brückler, Alois Brunner and Anton Burger escaped justice and lived their lives in the postwar years unpunished. The postwar whereabouts and activities of Ferdinand Daurach, Herbert Gerbing and Anton Zita remain unknown.

Since the Central Agency for Jewish Emigration is considered to have been a "pivot and fulcrum of Jewish life and death", and additionally considering the connection with Eichmann, its central archive of documents have long been sought out by historians. On 24 March 2000, the Berlin research firm "Facts & Files" issued a press release which stated that Berlin historian and archivist Jörg Rudolph had found a collection of "Eichmann dossiers" in the former Nazi archives of the Ministry for State Security of communist East Germany, which had, after the fall of the Berlin Wall, been relocated to the German Federal Archives’ temporary archive in Hoppegarten near Berlin. Rudolph told the press that this discovery consisted of an estimated 15,000 to 20,000 dossiers, making up nearly 100,000 single documents from Eichmann’s Central Agency for Jewish Emigration in Vienna. This "sensational find" made headlines around the world for the research firm, and the story was distributed by the Associated Press. In March 2001, the Commissioner of the Federal Government of Germany for Culture and Media placed five million marks (about 2.6 million dollars at the time) at the disposal of the Federal Archives to thoroughly investigate the research firm’s claim. In February 2004, the Federal Archives issued the results of their investigation:

”The press release from the year 2000, in which supposedly up to 20,000 “Eichmann dossiers” are to be found in the Nazi archives, may now, since completion of the investigation, be relegated once and for all to the realm of legend. In point of fact, under the title of “Project Eichmann”, the Ministry for State Security had a small collection of 20 dossiers of varying provenance, include the Sicherheitsdienst Main Office, the Gestapo, the Sicherheitsdienst Upper Donau Section, and the Central Agency for Jewish Emigration. In addition, some personal effects of Eichmann and a manhunt proclamation from the Society of Persecuted of the Nazi Regime were found.”

The supposed main archives of the Central Agency for Jewish Emigration in Vienna, whose archive signature location Rudolph attempted fruitlessly in the year 2000 to sell to Vienna historians for 15,600 marks (just over 8,000 US dollars at the time), consisted in fact of just 20 dossiers. Regarding Rudolph’s failed attempt to profit from what were in fact fictitious Holocaust documents, Eva Blimlinger from the Austrian History Commission stated: "It is strange that publicly available documents are being offered by a third party."

The main archives of the Central Agency for Jewish Emigration in Vienna were probably destroyed, along with other material from the SS-Reichssicherheitshauptamt (RSHA), in Ghetto Theresienstadt near the end of the war. Since the main archives either no longer exist or have not been found, the appropriate documents reconstructing the activities of the Central Agency of Vienna are scattered throughout diverse archives and records, such as the documents of the emigration funds in the Documentation Center of Austrian Resistance and the Magistrate of the City of Vienna. The nearly complete records of the Israelite Community of Vienna were transferred after the war to the Central Archives for the History of the Jewish People in Jerusalem. Many contemporary witness testimonials of the Israelite Community of Vienna were collected by the American Jewish Joint Distribution Committee and relay perhaps the best extant contemporary descriptions of the precarious situation of the Jewish population of Vienna. The whereabouts of the central archives of the Central Agency for Jewish Emigration in Vienna remain unknown.

== See also ==
- Glossary of Nazi Germany
- Holocaust train
- List of Nazi Party leaders and officials
- List of SS personnel
