= Apparatus (journal) =

Academic journal

Apparatus. Film, Media and Digital Cultures of Central and Eastern Europe (ISSN 2365-7758) is a bi-annual open-access academic journal with double blind peer-review. Apparatus is supported by the DFG (German Research Foundation), hosted by Freie Universität Berlin and edited by Dr Natascha Drubek. The first issue was published in September 2015. Apparatus publishes in the native languages of the region as well as in English. The editorial board includes scholars from the US, Europe and Russia.

== Scope ==
Apparatus covers a full range of digital and analogue media in the countries of Central, Eastern, and South-Eastern Europe including Russia (early technical media, film, radio, television, video, internet, DVD, etc.). The journal publishes both current and historical research, theoretical and empirical studies alike.

== Language Policy ==
Apparatus publishes articles in English as well as in other languages of the region. All of the abstracts are available in three languages – English, German, and Russian. Up until now Apparatus has published articles in English, German, Polish, Czech, Ukrainian and Russian.

== Special Issues ==
Decolonising the (Post-)Soviet Screen I. No. 17 (2023) and Decolonising the (Post-)Soviet Screen II. No. 18 (2024). Edited by Heleen Gerritsen.

The Haunted Medium I: Moving Images in the Russian Empire. No. 15 (2022) and The Haunted Medium II: Moving Images in the Russian Empire. No. 16 (2023). Edited by Rachel Morley, Natascha Drubek, Oksana Chefranova, and Denise J. Youngblood.

Soviet Playtime: Architectures of Power and Profligacy in DAU. No. 14 (2022). Edited by Philip Cavendish, Natascha Drubek, and Irina Schulzki – with texts by Ivan Kozlenko, Keti Chukhrov.

Putting the Empire to Music. The Phenomenon of Vocal-Instrumental Ensembles (VIA). No. 13 (2021). Edited by Clemens Günther and Christiane Schäfer

Pandemic Cinema in Central and Eastern Europe. No. 12 (2021). Edited by Raoul Eshelman, Mario Slugan, and Denise J. Youngblood

Yugoslav Performance Art: On the Deferred Production of Knowledge. No. 11 (2020). Edited by Goran Pavlić

Fiction in Central and Eastern European Film Theory and Practice. No. 8 (2019). Edited by J. Alexander Bareis and Mario Slugan

Women Cutting Movies: Editors from East and Central Europe. No. 7 (2018). Edited by Ana Grgic and Adelheid Heftberger, with the first instance of Artistic Research article, by Szilvia Ruszev.

Women at the Editing Table: Revising Soviet Film History of the 1920s and 1930s. No. 6 (2018). Edited by Adelheid Heftberger and Karen Pearlman

Mise en geste. Studies of Gesture in Cinema and Art. No. 5 (2017). Edited by Ana Hedberg Olenina and Irina Schulzki

Ghetto Films and their Afterlife No. 2-3 (2016). Edited by Natascha Drubek. The first special issue has grown out of an international conference devoted to the analysis of Nazi filmmaking in Theresienstadt Concentration Camp during the Second World War.

== Open Apparatus Book ==
In 2020 the first Open Apparatus Book appeared: Doing Performance Art History. Perspectives of Actors and Observers (2020). Edited by Sandra Frimmel, Tomáš Glanc, Sabine Hänsgen, Katalin Krasznahorkai, Nastasia Louveau, Dorota Sajewska, Sylvia Sasse.

== The Book Lab ==
In 2021, The Book Lab was started with a Prepub by Natascha Drubek, Hidden Figures. Rewriting the History of Cinema in the Empire of All the Russias, accompanied by an Open Peer Review by Denise J. Youngblood.

== Abstracting and Indexing ==
The journal is indexed in the Directory of Open Access Journals (doaj.org/toc/2365-7758) and Scopus (https://www.scopus.com/sourceid/21101038535).

== See also ==
- List of film periodicals
