= The Persecution and Murder of the European Jews by Nazi Germany, 1933–1945 =

German book series

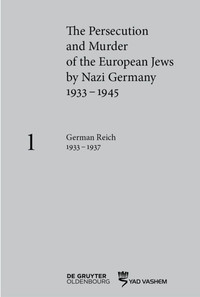
- Original title: Die Verfolgung und Ermordung der europäischen Juden durch das nationalsozialistische Deutschland 1933–194
- Language: German
- Genre: Non-fiction
- Publication date: 2008
- Publication place: Germany

The Persecution and Murder of the European Jews by Nazi Germany, 1933–1945 (German: Die Verfolgung und Ermordung der europäischen Juden durch das nationalsozialistische Deutschland 1933–1945, short: VEJ) is a German book series that contains documents relating to the Holocaust, edited and translated, with scholarly introductions by historians.

Since 2008, sixteen volumes have been published in German; the first two volumes have also been published in English. The third English volume was scheduled for publication in 2020.

== English volumes ==
1. Gruner, Wolf; Aly, Götz; Pearce, Caroline; Mas, Dorothy; Heim, Susanne (2019). German Reich 1933–1937. The Persecution and Murder of the European Jews by Nazi Germany, 1933-1945. Vol. 1. Berlin and Boston: De Gruyter. ISBN 978-3-11-035359-4.
2. Heim, Susanne; Pearce, Caroline (2019). German Reich 1938 – August 1939. Berlin and Boston: Walter de Gruyter GmbH & Co KG. ISBN 978-3-11-052638-7.
3. Löw, Andrea; Pearce, Caroline (2020). German Reich and Protectorate of Bohemia and Moravia September 1939 – September 1941. Berlin and Boston: Walter de Gruyter GmbH. ISBN 978-3-11-052374-4.
4. Friedrich, Klaus-Peter, ed. (2022). Poland: September 1939 – July 1941. Vol. 4. De Gruyter Oldenbourg. ISBN 978-3-11-068779-8.
5. Katja Happe; Michael Mayer; Maja Peers, eds. (2021). Western and Northern Europe 1940 – June 1942. De Gruyter Oldenbourg. ISBN 978-3-11-068769-9.
6. Not available
7. Not available
8. Not available
9. Friedrich, Klaus-Peter, ed. (2024). Poland: General Government August 1941–1945. De Gruyter Oldenbourg. ISBN 978-3-11-068741-5.
10. Not available
11. Not available
12. Katja Happe; Barbara Lambauer; Clemens Maier-Wolthausen, eds. (2022). Western and Northern Europe: June 1942–1945. Vol. 12. De Gruyter Oldenbourg. ISBN 978-3-11-068773-6.

== Sources ==
- Pohl, Dieter (2005). "Die Verfolgung und Ermordung der europäischen Juden durch das nationalsozialistische Deutschland 1933–1945. Ein neues Editionsprojekt" (PDF). Vierteljahrshefte für Zeitgeschichte. 4 (53): 651–659. doi:10.1524/vfzg.2005.53.4.651. S2CID 144722919.
- Angrick, Andrej (2008). "Dokumentation, Interpretation, Impuls. Das Editionsprojekt "Die Verfolgung und Ermordung der europäischen Juden 1933–1945"". Zeithistorische Forschungen/Studies in Contemporary History. 5: 446–450.
- Tönsmeyer, Tatjana (2015). "Rezension von: Die Verfolgung und Ermordung der europäischen Juden durch das nationalsozialistische Deutschland 1933–1945 (Band 3)". sehepunkte. 15 (4).
- Hajková, Anna (2013). "Die Verfolgung und Ermordung der europäischen Juden durch das nationalsozialistische Deutschland 1933–1945. Band 3. Deutsches Reich und Protektorat Böhmen und Mähren September 1939-September 1941. Bearbeitet von Andrea Löw". Bohemia. 53 (2): 476–478. doi:10.18447/BoZ-2013-3890.
- Schulz, Bernhard (30 July 2020). "So sah der jüdische Alltag in KZs in Polen aus". www.tagesspiegel.de (in German).
