= Hyperkino =

Digital system for referencing and annotating films

Hyperkino is a standardized system of referencing and annotating films on digital carriers – attaching related content and analysis to individual frames. The name of the method, Hyperkino, is based on the intertwining of the concepts of textual criticism and hypertext.

== From theory to practice ==
Hyperkino was developed by Natascha Drubek and Nikolai Izvolov from 2005 to 2008:

We have connected the traditional principles of annotation with digital technologies and their markup languages, applying hypermedia principles of commentary to the linear medium of film. Hyperkino annotations of a film are comparable to the footnotes and the commentary in historical-critical editions of texts, with the only difference being that they are comprised of various media forms (text, sound, pictures). […] The tradition of scholarly editions provides sophisticated ways of preserving texts over centuries, keeping them alive in constantly evolving receptions and commentaries. The idea of indexing a text, turning it into a network of interrelations and linking it with other texts, goes back to the tradition of editing scholarship.

Digital humanities scholar Christian Gosvig Olesen stresses the importance of the analytical and theoretical phase preceding practical steps towards developing and designing the Hyperkino method: “In 2006 Drubek and Izvolov penned an article together that formulated this vision, Critical Editions of Films on Digital Formats, which was published in the eighth edition of the international film studies review Cinema & Cie. in the fall of 2006.”

He characterizes Hyperkino as a philological reaction to audio commentaries which were the early and most popular forms of extras on DVDs:

The article departed from a critique of current presentations in academic and contextualizing analyses of films on DVD to conceptualize a new way of DVD editorship relying on annotations and a more extensive and effective use of the hyperlinked structure of the DVD format. One of the points of critique was that existing DVD editions much too often overburdened the works in question […] Drubek and Izvolov instead advocated for a use of annotations which could appear in conjunction with the film but also exist independently of it. As the basis of this proposition they proposed a distinction between the film in itself as textus, which should be able to stand alone and be viewed independently of an analytical interpretive layer, and on the other hand an apparatus including all that which is not part of the filmic text itself: notes on the film’s historical context, script, stills or for example correspondences or business documents related to the film’s production.

Hyperkino commentaries were made possible by the DVD format, introduced in 1996. In the ten years of its existence this format had produced several noteworthy audio commentaries by either filmmakers or scholars. However, it hardly had contributed to creating a standard of critical editions of films on digital carriers. In the academic environment of film studies the digital representation of film seemed to usher in a welcome convergence of film and writing on film. Digital technologies offered an option to explore the old medium of film from a new angle. The idea of a scholarly digital edition of a film surfaced several years after the first “Deluxe” editions of films with “deleted scenes” and other DVD extras were published. Scholarly interest in the DVD was driven by the requirement to have a stable “textus” which could be the basis of citations. In addition, film analysis asked for tools to annotate shots or even single frames in a film without destroying the cinematic text itself by intrusive modifications such as inserting talking heads or acousmatic voices of commentators.

From this perspective Hyperkino was an exercise in understatement compared to other DVD extras. Its principle was a hidden annotation linked to the film frame marked by a minimal sign, usually a number. Clicking the number leads the viewer onto an off-screen commentary text section. “These sections we call 'footnotes' for the film. The main difference to current DVD commentaries is the presentation of scholarly research: It happens not in an audio but in a written format which makes the commentary quotable. Every HYPERKINO DVD edition is tantamount to an introductory article about the film published. The film and texts about the film merge on the digital carrier.”

== Hyperkino DVDs ==
As a commercially available DVD format Hyperkino materialized itself three years after the programmatic article by Drubek and Izvolov. In 2008 Drubek produced a Hyperkino DVD in Berlin and Prague, publishing Nikolai Izvolov's reconstruction of Lev Kuleshov’s until then unpublished first film: Proekt inzhenera Praita.

Gosvig Olesen writes: “First in the fold of the German DVD publisher Absolutmedien and later as the series KinoAcademia published by RUSCICO. The film to launch the format was Lev Kuleshov’s debut feature Proekt inzhenera Prayta (Engineer Prite’s Project), USSR, 1918). Not only was it the first time the film was made available digitally, it had also, as pointed out by film historian Kristin Thompson, for a long time only existed in a version without intertitles, which left the impression that the film was incomplete.”

Hyperkino editions emphasize the importance of incorporating different versions of the film. Two versions can be found on the German DVD of Engineer Prite's Project allowing to compare the fragmented film as it lies in Gosfilmofond without intertitles with Izvolov's 2001 reconstruction of the film which incorporated textual material from a surviving original libretto. The DVD contains the TV documentary The Kuleshov Effect (USSR, 1969) by Semyon Raitburt (ЭФФЕКТ КУЛЕШОВА, 1969, Семён Райтбурт). The Hyperkino “footnotes” quote from interviews with Kuleshov and Viktor Shklovsky.

In the following years around a dozen of Hyperkino DVDs were released by the Russian publisher RUSCICO under the series title “Kino Academia” containing the annotations of international film scholars specializing in Russian and Soviet film: Aleksandr Deriabin, Natascha Drubek, Bernard Eisenschitz, Jeremy Hicks, Nikolai Izvolov, Ekaterina Khokhlova, Milena Musina, Sergei Kapterev, Natalia Riabchikova, and Yuri Tsivian. Not all of the initially announced DVDs have been published yet, due to the high production costs.

The Childhood of Maxim Gorky, 1938

Donskoy, Mark

By the Bluest of Seas, 1936

Barnet, Boris

Happiness, 1934

Medvedkin, Aleksander

The Great Consoler, 1933

Kuleshov, Lev

Outskirts, 1933

Barnet, Boris

The Heir to Genghis Khan (Storm Over Asia), 1928

Pudovkin, Vsevolod

October, 1927

Eisenstein, Sergei

The Girl with the Hatbox, 1927

Barnet, Boris

Strike, 1924

Eisenstein, Sergei

Engineer Prite's Project, 1913

Kuleshov, Lev

In line with the aims described in Drubek's and Izvolov's 2005 article, every Hyperkino DVD edition consists of a textus and an apparatus. The apparatus in Hyperkino editions consists of alternative versions and “footnotes” connected to the film. Footnote numbers on all Hyperkino DVDs appear during playback in the upper right corner of the frame. In the RUSCICO editions the textus is on disc 1 (language versions) and the apparatus on disc 2 (film without language versions but with Hyperkino footnotes).

== Awards ==
In 2010 at the Bologna festival Il Cinema Ritrovato three Hyperkino titles were awarded with the “DVD Awards 2010, VII edition. Best Special Features (Bonus) for their innovative handling of printed and illustrated commentaries”. The three DVDs were:

- The Great Consoler (Russia/1933) by Lev Kuleshov – Ruscico (Russia) - hyperkino annotations by Ekaterina Khokhlova
- Engineer Prite's Project (Russia/1918) by Lev Kuleshov – Ruscico (Russia) - hyperkino annotations by N. Drubek-Meyer / Nikolai Izvolov
- October (Russia/1927) by Sergey Eisenstein, Grigori Aleksandrov – Ruscico (Russia) - hyperkino annotations by Yuri Tsivian

In the same year Hyperkino received another award from the Russian Guild of Film Critics and Scholars, the “Elephant 2010” (Kinovedenie i kinokritika v elektronnych SMI, novye technologii).

== Reviews and reactions ==
“The idea of Hyperkino is a sensational breakthrough: imagine what a potential is looming here!”

In his article "The Mosaic Approach. In defense of a nonlinear film criticism" Jonathan Rosenbaum describes Hyperkino as "a hybrid form—existing somewhere between reading and watching, like various computer-related activities—is part of what seems forward-looking about them […] What all these forms of criticism suggest is not merely a less linear way of approaching film experience but also a more interactive methodology. The fact that movies are being seen more and more often away from public theaters shouldn't necessarily mean that the way we all experience them and share our experiences is any less social. Perhaps it's more pertinent to note that the very forms of our social interactions in relation to films are changing as well."

Julian Graffy discusses Hyperkino from the perspective of the “commentarist”: “Engaging with the Hyperkino commentaries leads to thoughts about the fundamental differences between a spoken commentary, the only version most viewers will so far have encountered, and the (predominantly written) Hyperkino approach.” Graffy mentions the time factor which challenged the performance of audio commentators: “bottlenecks, where too much is happening at once for you to cover all you want to say; and longueurs, where you wonder how to fill the space, or worry about extended periods of silence. […] None of these problems exists, of course, for the Hyperkino commentarist – he or she is not time-bound, and the notes can be as short or as long as required. They can also be more scholarly – the notes on Strike especially are full of references to sources both printed and archival – indicating to the scholar/student viewer where to do further research. And, above all, they have the advantage of hybridity, which is why the Hyperkino notes are more than just a book on screen.”

In 2011 film critic and media scholar Joachim Schätz called the Hyperkino publication of the Kuleshov debut a "mediated revolution" (“vermittelte Revolution”) and Hyperkino "one of the most exciting forms of reflection on film one can experience today."

== Bibliography ==
- Natascha Drubek and Nikolai Izvolov, "Critical Editions of Films on Digital Formats”, Cinema & Cie (autumn 2006). http://hyperkino.net/hyperkino/Texts-Archive/Critical-Editions-of-Films-on-Digital-Formats (English)
- Natascha Drubek and Nikolai Izvolov, "Kritická vydání filmů v digitálních formátech”. In: Iluminace 2005/3; p. 127-137. (Czech)
- Natascha Drubek and Nikolai Izvolov, "Textkritische Editionen von Filmen auf DVD. Ein Diskussionsbeitrag", in: montage a/v. Zeitschrift für Theorie & Geschichte audiovisueller Kommunikation, 16/1/07, p. 183-199. (German) http://www.montage-av.de/pdf/161_2007/161_2007_Natascha_Drubeck-Meyer_Nikolai_Izvolov_Textkritische-Editionen.pdf
- Arina Abrosimova; Novoe - chorosho zabytoe staroe. Literaturnaja gazeta : Ezhenedel'naja gazeta. - 2012. - 23-29 maja (No. 21), p. 8. http://www.lgz.ru/article/N21--6370---2012-05-23-/Novo%D0%B5-%E2%80%93-horosho-zab%D1%8Bto%D0%B5-staro%D0%B519058/
- Eva Binder: Lew Kuleschow: Das Projekt des Ingenieurs Pright. 1918. DVD-Edition hg. von absolut MEDIEN 2008. Mit Hyperkino-Kommentar von Nikolai Izvolov und Natascha Drubek-Meyer. Osteuropa 2012, 5, 120–122.
- Peter Bosma: Hyperkino. Een DVD met voetnoten (2010) http://www.peterbosma.info/?p=blog&blog=30
- Michael Brooke, Review of 2 Hyperkino DVDs of Eisenstein's Oktyabr and Stachka, Sight & Sound Vol. 20, Issue 8, 2010, p. 87.
- Michael Brooke: Review of 2 Hyperkino DVDs (RUSCICO) of Kuleshov's Engineer Prite's Project and The Great Consoler, Sight & Sound Vol. 20, Issue 8, 2010, p. 88.
- Dagmar Brunow: Lew Kuleschow: Das Projekt des Ingenieurs Pright (1918). Eine Wiederentdeckung sowjetischen Kinos vor der staatlichen Förderung, Lorettas Leselampe, Freies Sender Kombinat, Hamburg (10/8/2008) [radio].
- N.S. Cvetova / U. Marggraff: Rezension: Vsevolod Pudovkin: The Heir to Genghis Khan / Storm Over Asia. 1928. DVD-Edition mit 2 DVD. Hg.: RUSCICO 2011. Hyperkino-Annotationen von Sergej Kapterev. https://augenspiele.wordpress.com/2013/02/11/vsevolod-pudovkin-the-heir-to-genghis-khan-storm-over-asia-1928-dvd-edition-mit-2-dvd-hg-ruscico-2011-hyperkino-annotationen-von-sergej-kapterev-n-s-cvetova-u-marggraff/
- N. Drubek-Meyer: K voprosu o metodologii istoriko-kriticheskogo izdanija fil’mov na DVD. In: Mark Zak (ed.), Istorija kino: Sovremennyi vzgljad. Kinovedenie i kritika, Moskau 2004, 56–61.
- N. Drubek & Erich Sargeant: Paraphrase or commentarius currens: DVD commentaries and ancient editing traditions. In: G. Bursi, S. Venturini, (ed.) Critical Editions of Film. Film Tradition, Film Transcription in the Digital Era. Pasian di Prato 2008, p. 117-23.
- Christian Gosvig Olesen: “What Is Hyperkino? Ruscico’s Academia DVD series and the historical-critical film edition” https://filmhistoryinthemaking.com/2013/08/10/what-is-hyperkino-ruscicos-academia-dvd-series-and-the-historical-critical-film-edition/
- Julian Graffy, [Hyperkino] DVD Reviews. Studies in Russian and Soviet Cinema, Volume 4, Number 3, 1 December 2010, pp. 345–35 http://hyperkino.net/hyperkino/Texts-Archive/HYPERKINO-2010
- Michal Kosák, K podobě komentáře : nad filmovou sérií Hyperkino. Slovo a smysl, 10, 2013, č. 20, p. 314-317. http://slovoasmysl.ff.cuni.cz/node/499
- Stephen Norris, Review of Proekt Inzhenera Praita (Engineer Prite's Project), Directed by Lev Kuleshov, 1918, 30 Minutes; Hyperkino commentary by Nikolai Izvolov and Natascha Drubek-Meyer. RUSCICO: Kino Academia 1; Velikii uteshitel’ (O. Genri v tiur’me) (The Great Consoler (O Henry in Prison), Directed by Lev Kuleshov, 1933, 91 Minutes); Hyperkino commentary by Ekaterina Khokhlova. RUSCICO: Kino Academia 3. http://www.artmargins.com/index.php/6-film-a-video/634-lev-kuleshov-dir-qproekt-inzhenera-praitaq-qengineer-prites-projectq-qvelikii-uteshitel-o-genri-v-tiurmeq-qthe-great-consoler-ohenry-in-prisonq-dvd-review
- John Riley: "The Full Picture", in Sight & Sound, 22 Sept 2012.
- Jonathan Rosenbaum: "The Mosaic Approach. In defense of a nonlinear film criticism", August 18, 2010, Journal Moving Image Source, Museum of the Moving Image, N.Y. http://www.movingimagesource.us/articles/the-mosaic-approach-20100818
- Artem Sopin [Артем СОПИН]: Kinotekstologiia. Opyt klassifikatsii. In: Kinovedcheskie zapiski 98, 2011, p. 210-225. http://www.kinozapiski.ru/data/home/articles/attache/210-225.pdf
- Kristin Thompson, “More revelations of film history on DVD”, October 24, 2010 http://www.davidbordwell.net/blog/2010/10/24/more-revelations-of-film-history-on-dvd/
