= Jörg Osterloh =

German historian (born 1967)

Jörg Osterloh (born 1967) is a German historian. His book, Nationalsozialistische Judenverfolgung im Reichsgau Sudetenland 1938-1945, discusses the Holocaust in the Sudetenland and is based on his 2004 doctorate at the University of Jena. Since 2008, he has worked as a research assistant at the Fritz Bauer Institute and lecturer at Goethe University. Since 2009, he has edited the journal Einsicht. Bulletin des Fritz Bauer Instituts.

== Works ==
- Osterloh, Jörg (2006). Nationalsozialistische Judenverfolgung im Reichsgau Sudetenland 1938-1945 (in German). Oldenbourg. ISBN 978-3-486-57980-2.
- Osterloh, Jörg (2010). Nacionálněsocialistické pronásledování Židů v říšské župě Sudety v letech 1938-1945 (in Czech). Argo. ISBN 978-80-257-0213-0.
- The Greater German Reich and the Jews, ed. Osterloh and Wolf Gruner, 2010 and 2015
- Osterloh, Jörg; Wixforth, Harald (2014). Unternehmer und NS-Verbrechen: Wirtschaftseliten im "Dritten Reich" und in der Bundesrepublik Deutschland (in German). Campus Verlag. ISBN 978-3-593-42449-1.
