= H. G. Adler =

Austrian poet, novelist (1910–1988)

Hans Günther Adler (2 July 1910 – 21 August 1988) was a Czech-English German-language poet and novelist, scholar, and Holocaust survivor.

== Life ==
Born in Prague, Bohemia, to Emil and Alice Adler, Hans Günther Adler was a Jew, though not devout. After his graduation in 1935 from Charles University, where he studied music and literature, arts and sciences, he worked as a secretary and teacher at the Urania, a pedagogical institute. This also involved him in some radio broadcasting.

In 1941 he was sent to a Jewish labour camp where he worked until shortly before his deportation to Theresienstadt with his family on February 8, 1942. Adler was to spend two and a half years in Theresienstadt with his family before being deported to Auschwitz. At Theresienstadt, Adler avoided doing work that might implicate him in the running of the ghetto and did only manual work, such as room duty and building. His wife, who was a medical doctor and chemist, led the medical central bureau. On October 14, 1944, he arrived with his wife and her mother at Auschwitz.

Both women were put in the gas chambers that day. Gertrud could have survived, but refused to leave her mother. Adler was to lose his mother and father and sixteen members of his family to the Holocaust.

On October 28, 1944, Adler was deported to Niederoschel, a subdivision of Buchenwald, and in 1945, to Langenstein, another subdivision of Buchenwald. On April 13, 1945, he was free. From July and December of that year he was near Prague, helping Przemysl Pitter to care for children who had survived the war, both Jewish and non-Jewish.

From October 1945 until February 1947, Adler worked in the Jewish Museum in Prague, where he devoted himself chiefly to the building up of the archives about the times of persecution and the Theresienstadt camp. At this time he was also involved in accumulating the documents from the camp, possibly with the intention of bringing them to Palestine. Although some material was brought to Jerusalem, for the most part this project was not completed. He stopped using the name "Hans Günther" because it was the name of a leading official in the Central Office for Jewish Emigration in Prague.

In June 1946 he lost his Сzechoslovakian citizenship because of his German mother tongue. To escape the impending Communist takeover of Czechoslovakia, Adler fled to London in February 1947, where he married a close friend from Prague, the sculptor Bettina Gross, with whom he fathered his only child Jeremy Adler.

He then became a freelance writer and scholar and went on to author 26 books on history, sociology and philosophy as well as poetry, and including several autobiographical works, notably nonfiction and fictional works on the Holocaust. Writing in the Financial Times, Simon Schama says that Adler's work deserves a place beside other twentieth century witnesses of the concentration camps such as Primo Levi and Solzhenitsyn.

Adler's first major work was the study of the ghetto Theresienstadt, Theresienstadt 1941-1945. Das Antlitz einer Zwangsgemeinschaft (Theresienstadt 1941–1945. The Face of an Enforced Community), first published in 1955 and in an enlarged edition in 1960. The book was an international success. As the first scholarly monograph devoted to a single camp it became one of the foundational works of Holocaust Studies. It is still the most detailed account of any single concentration camp. Adler's first fiction novel was Panorama (1968). Another novel was The Journey, described as "Holocaust modernism" in a 2009 review in The New York Times. Three of Adler's novels, The Journey, Panorama and The Wall, have been translated into English by Peter Filkins. An English translation of his monograph about Theresienstadt was published in 2017.

He received the Leo Baeck Prize in 1958, the Prix Charles Veillon in 1969 for Panorama; the Buber-Rosenzweig-Medal in 1974 and an honorary Ph.D. from the Pedagogical University of Berlin in 1980.

Adler died in London, England in 1988.

== Awards ==
- Leo Baeck Prize (1958)
- Charles Veillon Prize (Lausanne, 1969)
- Buber-Rosenzweig Medal (Berlin, 1974)
- Corresponding member of the Bavarian Academy of Fine Arts (1979)
- Honorary Doctor of the Pedagogical University of Berlin (1980)
- Cross of the Order of Merit of the Federal Republic of Germany (1985)
- Austrian Cross of Honour for Science and Art (1985)

== Works ==
- Theresienstadt. 1941–1945. Das Antlitz einer Zwangsgemeinschaft, Geschichte Soziologie Psychologie. Tübingen: Mohr, 1955. (Theresienstadt: Das Antlitz einer Zwangsgemeinschaft. Göttingen, Edition:reprint vom Wallstein Verlag, 926 Seiten. 2005. ISBN 978-3-89244-694-1)
- Die verheimlichte Wahrheit. Theresienstädter Dokumente, 1958
- Der Kampf gegen die „Endlösung der Judenfrage“, 1958
- Die Juden in Deutschland. Von der Aufklärung bis zum Nationalsozialismus, 1960
- Unser Georg und andere Erzählungen, 1961
- Eine Reise, Roman, Bibliotheca christiana, Bonn 1962; mit einem Nachwort von Jeremy Adler, Aufbau Taschenbuch Verlag, Berlin, 2002, ISBN 3-7466-1854-1
- Der Fürst des Segens, 1964
- Die Erfahrung der Ohnmacht, 1964
- Sodoms Untergang, Bagatellen, 1965
- Kontraste und Variationen, Essays, 1969
- Ereignisse, Kleine Erzählungen und Novellen, 1969
- Der verwaltete Mensch: Studien zur Deportation der Juden aus Deutschland, Mohr-Verlag, Tübingen, 1974, ISBN 3-16-835132-6
  - New edition, with a preface by Götz Aly. S. Fischer Verlag, Frankfurt am Main 2026.. ISBN 9783103976557
- Fenster, Gedichte, 1974
- Viele Jahreszeiten, Gedichte, 1975
- Die Freiheit des Menschen, Essays, 1976
- Spuren und Pfeiler, Gedichte, 1978
- Transsubstantations, Gedichte, 1978
- Zeiten auf der Spur, Gedichte, 1978
- Blicke, Gedichte, 1979
- Stimme und Zuruf, Gedichte, 1980
- Panorama. Roman in 10 Bildern, Piper-Verlag, 1988, ISBN 3-492-10891-1
- Der Wahrheit verpflichtet. Interviews, Gedichte, Essays Hrsg. von Jeremy Adler, Bleicher-Verlag, Gerlingen, 1998, ISBN 3-88350-660-5
- Nach der Befreiung, Ausgewahlte Essays zur Geschichte und Soziologie, Hrsg. von Peter Filkins, Konstanz University Press, 2013, ISBN 978-3-86253-041-0
- Theresienstadt, 1941-1945 : the face of a coerced community / H.G. Adler; translated by Belinda Cooper; general editor, Amy Loewenhaar-Blauweiss; with an afterword by Jeremy Adler; New York, NY: Cambridge University Press, 2017
