= Anton Burger =

Austrian war criminal (1911–1991)

- Born: November 19, 1911; Neunkirchen, Austria-Hungary
- Died: 25 December 1991 (aged 80); Essen, North Rhine-Westphalia, Germany
- Conviction: Crimes against humanity (in absentia)
- Penalty: Death (in absentia)
- Military career
- Allegiance: Germany
- Branch: Schutzstaffel
- Service years: 1934–1945
- Rank: SS-Hauptsturmführer
- Units: Gestapo
- Commands: Theresienstadt concentration camp, 1943-1944

Anton "Toni" Burger (19 November 1911 – 25 December 1991) was a Hauptsturmführer (Captain) in the German Nazi SS, Judenreferent in Greece (1944) and Lagerkommandant of Theresienstadt concentration camp.

== Military career ==
Anton Burger was born in Neunkirchen, Austria, the son of a stationery dealer. He joined the Austrian Army in 1930 and the Austrian Nazi Party in 1932. In June 1933 the Nazi Party was officially banned in Austria by the government of Engelbert Dollfuss and Burger was dishonorably discharged from the army in July. He moved illegally to Lechfeld near Augsburg in Germany, where he became a member of the Austrian Legion, a paramilitary group composed of pro-Nazi Austrian expatriates. Shortly afterward he joined the Sturmabteilung (SA). In 1935 he received German citizenship and moved into the SA barracks.

Burger went to Vienna to participate with the Austrian Legion in the Anschluss on 12 March 1938. He was inducted into the SS and assigned to the Central Agency for Jewish Emigration in Vienna, where he was a member of the Reich Security Main Office Special Action Command "Eichmann" (RSHA Sondereinsatzkommando under Adolf Eichmann).

In the summer of 1939, he was transferred to the Central Agency for Jewish Emigration in Prague, where he participated in the expropriation of about 1,400 Jewish households. In April 1941 he was promoted to Obersturmführer (Second Lieutenant). In the spring of 1941 he was promoted to head of the RSHA branch office in Brno.

In 1942 Burger was ordered to Brussels by Eichmann to coordinate efforts to deport Belgian, Dutch and French Jews. Burger served at Auschwitz concentration camp in 1943 before becoming the Commandant of Theresienstadt concentration camp from July 3, 1943, to February 7, 1944. He was known for his cruelty as a camp commander; on 11 November 1943 he ordered the entire camp population of approximately 40,000 people to stand in freezing weather during a camp census. About 300 prisoners died of hypothermia as a result.

In February 1944 he was sent to Greece by Eichmann to replace Dieter Wisliceny, with whom Eichmann was dissatisfied. As head of the Sicherheitsdienst in Athens under Colonel Walter Blume, Burger organized the deportations of Romaniote and Sephardi Jews from Rhodes, Kos, Athens Ioannina, and Corfu (a total of over 3,000 people), earning a promotion to SS-Hauptsturmführer (Captain) by June 1944.

== Capture and escapes ==
After the war, Burger was arrested in Altaussee, Austria and held in an internment camp near Salzburg. He was then convicted in absentia by the People's Court in the Czech Litoměřice and sentenced to death. In June 1947, shortly before he could be extradited to Austria so he could be executed, Burger escaped from the detention center. He lived under an assumed name in his hometown of Neunkirchen until his second arrest in March 1951 after which he was held in Austrian custody in Vienna. On 9 April 1951, Burger managed to escape and disappeared without a trace.

Following his second escape he lived on the border of Germany and Austria under eight different aliases. From 1960 to 1961 he worked as a warden on a mountain near the river Alm. After 1961, despite poorly forged documents, Burger moved with his wife Elfriede to the city of Essen and began working as a salesman under the name Wilhelm Bauer. After being laid off in 1974 and suffering a heart attack he lived out his days in Essen until his death from natural causes on Christmas Day 1991. His identity was not uncovered until March 1994, more than two years after his death. This was confirmed to the Vienna Simon Wiesenthal Center by the Bavarian Landeskriminalamt.

In 2011, it was revealed that Burger had in fact not made up the name "Wilhelm Bauer". Wilhelm Bauer was a Jewish prisoner at Theresienstadt whom Burger had personally murdered in 1944. Bauer at the time had been collaborating with the Nazis and making a propaganda film, believing that collaboration meant survival. Burger strongly disliked Bauer because he wore glasses, and to Burger, that meant Jewish intellectualism and weakness.

== Readings ==
- Hans Safrian: Eichmann und seine Gehilfen. Fischer-Taschenbuch-Verlag, Frankfurt am Main 1995, ISBN 3-596-12076-4.
- Ernst Klee: Das Personenlexikon zum Dritten Reich: Wer war was vor und nach 1945. Fischer-Taschenbuch-Verlag, Frankfurt am Main 2007, ISBN 978-3-596-16048-8.
