= Roy Kift =

British playwright

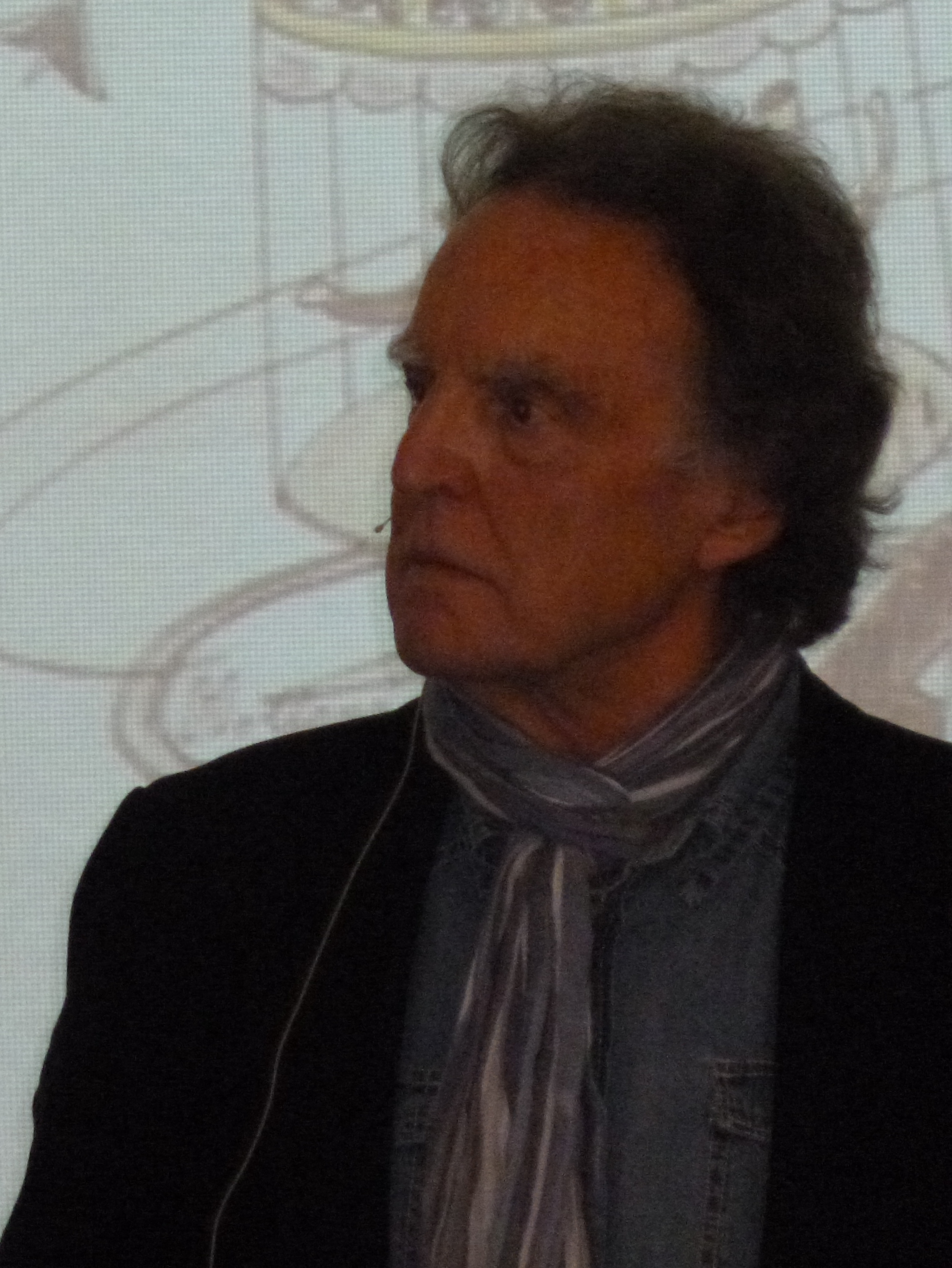
Kift in 2014

Roy Kift is an English actor and playwright who is resident in Germany. He is best known for his 1980 play Stronger than Superman (German: Stärker als Superman).

== Early life and education ==
After gaining a degree in French and Romance Studies at the Aberystwyth University in Wales in 1965, Kift completed a three-year acting course at the London Drama Centre. He started writing plays at university, where he won the Eisteddfod playwriting prize.

== Career ==
Kift's first engagement as a professional actor was at the Sheffield Playhouse. He performed for a season at the Newcastle Playhouse before moving to London to play in Mustapha Matura's Black Pieces.

His first breakthrough as a playwright was with Mary Mary, which premiered at the Royal Court Theatre Upstairs in London in a production by the Freehold Theatre Company, directed by Nancy Meckler. He was subsequently awarded the Thames Television Theatre Prize for his play Downers.

Kift moved to Berlin in 1979, the same year that he wrote the play Stronger than Superman (Stärker als Superman) for Grips-Theater. It was performed in Berlin in 1980/81.

His play Camp Comedy (published in The Theatre of the Holocaust, Volume 2, edited by Robert Skloot in 1999), was performed in New York in 2003. The play focuses on German actor and director Kurt Gerron, who was forced by the Nazis to make a propaganda film about Theresienstadt in order to deceive visiting Red Cross officials. He also featured in Kurt Gerrons Karussell (1999), a documentary film directed by Austrian Jewish documentary filmmaker Ilona Ziok starring Ute Lemper.

He has also written plays for television and radio.

== Other activities ==
In addition to his theatre work, Kift has also written three travel guides and published a children's book.

He is the English translator of plays by Patrick Süskind, Heinar Kipphardt, and others.

== Personal life ==
Kift moved to Berlin in 1979 to join his partner Dagmar, who was studying there. He was married to historian Dagmar Kift for over 25 years, before her death in 2020.

== Works (selection) ==
=== Theatre plays ===
- 1962: And Betty Martin…. (1st Prize University of Wales Eisteddfod)
- 1968: The Continuing Tale of the Supermale. Sheffield Playhouse
- 1970: Mary Mary. Royal Court Theatre Upstairs, later European tour incl. Amsterdam and Zurich. La Mama Theater, New York
- 1971: Genesis. Freehold Theatre, London
- 1974: Downers. Bradford University
- 1976: The Complete Whole Earth Catalogue. Royal Shakespeare Company, Donmar Theatre, London
- 1976: Smile for Jesus and the Cameraman. ICA London
- 1976: Cakewalk. Hampstead Theatre, London
- 1977: Happy and Glorious. (co-author Patrick Barlow), Almost Free Theatre, London
- 1978: Land of Hope and Glory. (co-author Patrick Barlow) Theatre Royal Stratford East
- 1980: Stärker als Superman. World Premiere: GRIPS Theatre, Berlin
- 1981: Stronger than Superman. Unicorn Theatre, London (translated into 21 languages)
- 1984: Joy, Opera libretto. Composer: Susanne Erding. World premiere. Kiel Opera House, Germany
- 1992: Dreams of Beating Time. Holocaust play on Wilhelm Furtwängler and his former colleagues in the Theresienstadt concentration camp
- 1999: Camp Comedy. (Holocaust play about Kurt Gerron and the cabaret in the Theresienstadt concentration camp. Published by the University of Wisconsin Press. Translations: German, Polish, French. World amateur premiere, CUNY GENESEO 2003, directed by Randy Kaplan. World professional premiere, Legnica, Poland, September 2012) The production was invited to the prestigious Warsaw Theatre Meeting in April 2013 and was later awarded the Grand Prix at the XXIV "Bez Granic" International Theatre Festival in Cieszyn (Poland/Czech Republic).
- 2005: Cathedral of Heresies. S. Fischer Verlag (On problems in the Roman Catholic Church)
- 2010: Nothing. Stage adaptation of Janne Teller’s novel for young people. (Strident Press, GB)
- 2011: The True Story of Adam and Eve as personally dictated by God Almighty, the Creator of Heaven and Earth to his prophet Moses between 2.41 pm on the 28th May and 9.27 am on 3 June 1423 BC and later published in a condensed version in the Book of Genesis for the salvation of humanity. (A three-person comedy debunking the GENESIS myth as a man-made fiction to justify an authoritarian, male-dominated world. German and English versions.)
- 2011: The Day God went on Facebook, a satirical comedy in 2 Acts.(also available in German and Polish)
- 2013: One, Two, Free, a play for two persons about the performance of Verdi's Requiem in the Theresienstadt Ghetto in 1944. World amateur premiere, SUNY GENESEO, directed by Joshua Shabshish and performed by Jordan Griffen and Emily Bantelman.
- 2015: Eden's Garden, a play about Britain's refusal to help the Jews in Poland during the Second World War
- 2024: The Burning House, a dystopian drama about a man on the run from the deluded values of a totalitarian society. Cast: 4-8.

=== Children's book ===
- Franz, Anna und die Zechengeister. Klartext Verlag, Essen 1997, ISBN 978-3-88474-608-0

=== Travel guides ===
- Tour the Ruhr. 4th edition, Klartext Verlag, Essen 2011, ISBN 978-3-88474-815-2
- The Wupper Valley. Wuppertal, Solingen, Remscheid and the Bergisch Land. Klartext Verlag, Essen 2005, ISBN 978-3-89861-520-4
- Düsseldorf, Aachen and the Lower Rhine. Klartext Verlag, Essen 2008, ISBN 978-3-89861-892-2
- The Complete Ruhrgebiet Klartext Verlag, Essen,2018. ISBN 978-3-8375-1876-4
