= Kurt Gerron =

German actor (1897–1944)

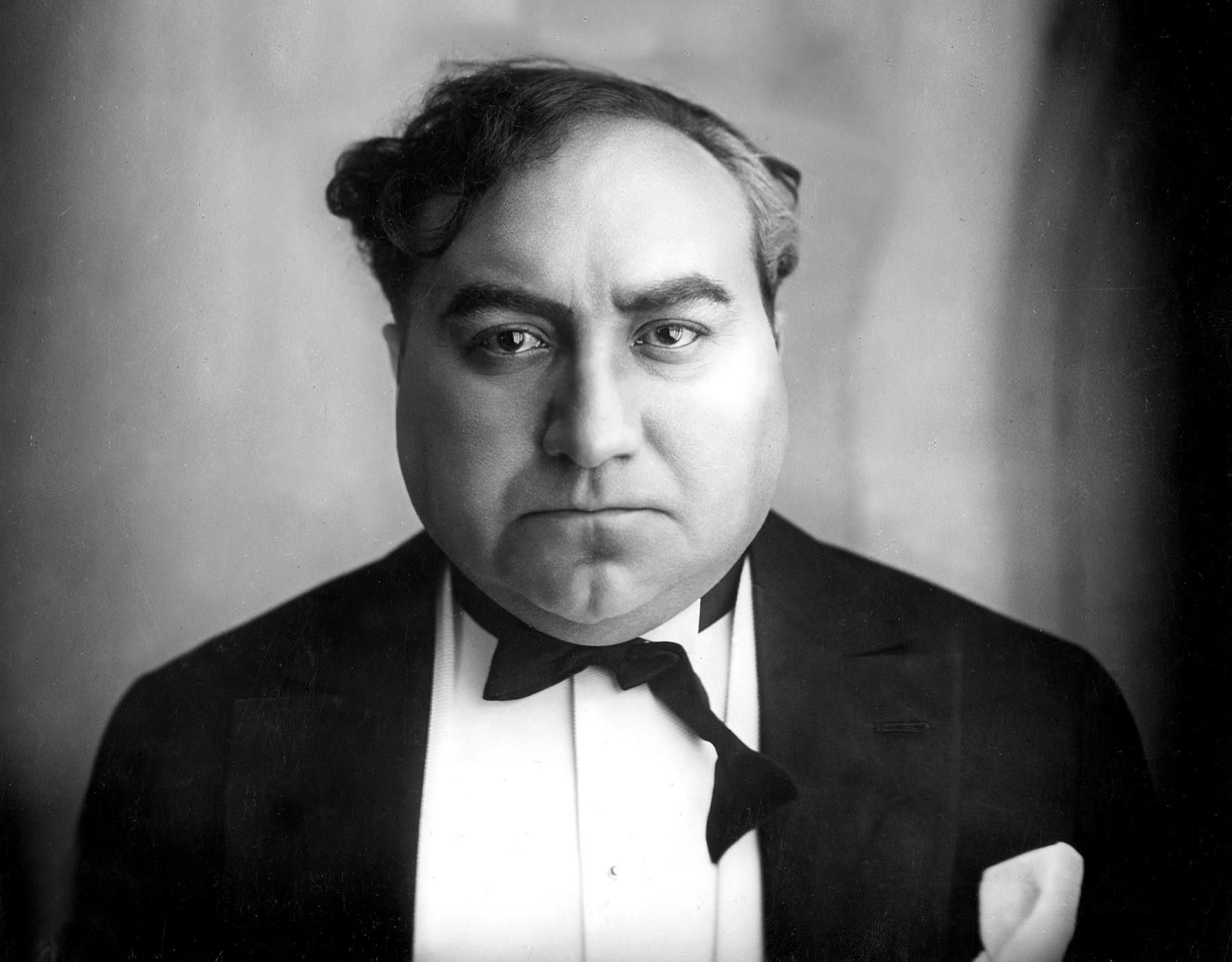
- Kurt Gerron in 1928.
- Born: Kurt Gerson; 11 May 1897; Berlin, German Empire
- Died: 30 October 1944 (aged 47); Auschwitz-Birkenau, German-occupied Poland
- Occupations: Actor, film director
- Years active: 1920–1944

Kurt Gerron (born Kurt Gerson; 11 May 1897 – 30 October 1944) was a German Jewish actor and film director. He had a very successful career in cabaret and film before World War II, but was then forbidden to work and was sent to Theresienstadt Ghetto after the Nazis had occupied the Netherlands, where he and his family had fled to. He was forced by the Nazis to make a propaganda film about Theresienstadt, officially named Theresienstadt. Ein Dokumentarfilm aus dem jüdischen Siedlungsgebiet, before he and his wife, Olga Gerson-Meyer, were sent to Auschwitz concentration camp and murdered. The film was completed not long before the end of the war, but was never shown to the public, and only fragments remain.

== Early life and education ==
Kurt Gerron was born as Kurt Gerson in Berlin, Germany, on 11 May 1897, the only child of Max and Toni (née Riese) Gerson. His father ran a clothing business.

He was badly injured twice during combat after enlisting in the German Army during World War I, so was discharged. He started studying medicine, and re-enlisted in the army as a doctor after two years. He completed his studies after the war ended, but decided to embark on a career in acting a year later, having started to perform on stage around 1920.

== Acting and filmmaking career ==
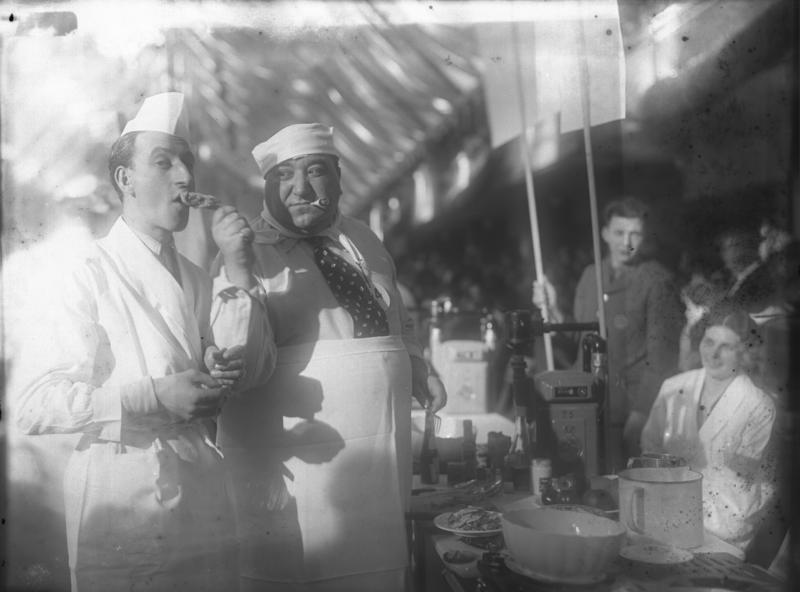
Comedy duo Sig Arno and Kurt Gerron, Berlin 1931

Gerron first appeared on stage in a cabaret performance called Kuka in Berlin. He joined the Wilden Buhne ("Wild Stage") cabaret troupe in 1921, subsequently working with several other troupes as well as working under theatre director Max Reinhardt. Around the same time, he started taking parts in silent films, later also finding success in talkies.

In 1928, Gerron appeared as "Tiger" Brown in the Berlin premiere of The Threepenny Opera (Die Dreigroschenoper), by Bertolt Brecht and Kurt Weill, at the Theater am Schiffbauerdamm. This was highly successful, and the song "Mack the Knife", sung by Gerron, was recorded and became a hit across Europe. In 1930, he played Kiepert the magician in the film, The Blue Angel (Der Blaue Engel), with Marlene Dietrich. During the following three years, he appeared in many films and also directed many more, attaining a high degree of success. He was offered a trip to Hollywood, but chose to stay in Germany.

=== Under the Nazis ===
After the 1933 seizure of power by the Nazis (known today as the Machtergreifung), Gerron, along with other Jewish actors, musicians, film and theatre people, were forced out of their jobs. Gerron was in the middle of directing Kind Ich Freu Mich Auf Dein Kommen at UFA Studios when he was marched off the set by Nazi soldiers on 1 April 1933, the day of the "national boycott on German Jewry".

Gerron left Nazi Germany with his wife and parents, travelling first to Paris, then to Vienna, and later to Amsterdam, where they occupied a house at Frans van Mierisstrat 78, bovenhuis. He continued work there as an actor at the Stadsschouwburg and directed several movies. Several times he was offered employment in Hollywood through the agency of Peter Lorre and Josef von Sternberg, but Gerron refused to leave Europe.

In 1937, Gestapo headquarters in Lüneburg issued an order which forbade truck drivers from displaying pictures on their vehicles of the Nazi officer Ernst Röhm, as well as Gerron and Fritz Grünbaum, a Jewish Austrian cabaret artist.

After the Wehrmacht occupied the Netherlands in May 1940, Gerron continued to work as a performer and director for three years. His parents were deported on 5 May 1943, and murdered in Sobibor after being interned in the transit camp at Westerbork. In September 1943, Gerron and his wife Olga were arrested and sent to Westerbork, where he continued to perform cabaret.

=== Theresienstadt ===
On 25 February 1944 Gerron and his wife were sent to the Theresienstadt Ghetto. There he was forced by the SS to stage the cabaret review, Karussell, in which he reprised Mack the Knife, as well as compositions by Martin Roman and other imprisoned musicians and artists.

In 1944, Gerron was coerced into directing a Nazi propaganda film intended to be viewed in "neutral" nations such as Switzerland, Sweden, and Ireland, for example, showing how "humane" conditions were at Theresienstadt. The film had originally been planned in December 1943, but had been interrupted by a visit to Theresienstadt by a Red Cross delegation in June 1944. Ahead of the planned visit, the Nazis cleaned up the camp and deported large numbers of Jews to Auschwitz concentration camp to avoid the appearance of overcrowding in the ghetto. The delegates were only allowed to speak to selected residents, under SS supervision, and the deception worked; the report stated that the city was "like any other", and the delegates did not investigate the thousands of Jews who passed through on their way to concentration camps.

Gerron's script, submitted to Commandant Karl Rahm, was based around the theme of water, including rivers, bathtubs, showers, and irrigation ditches, and was approved by the authorities. Once filming was finished, Gerron and members of the jazz pianist Martin Roman's Ghetto Swingers were deported on the camp's final train transport to Auschwitz on 28 October 1944. Gerron and his wife were murdered in the gas chamber immediately upon arrival on 30 October 1944, along with the film's entire performing entourage (except for Roman and guitarist Coco Schumann). The next day, Reichsführer SS Heinrich Himmler ordered the closure of the gas chambers.

The film was completed in March 1945, and was never shown to the public. All known complete prints of the film, which was to have been called Theresienstadt. Ein Dokumentarfilm aus dem jüdischen Siedlungsgebiet (Terezin: A Documentary Film of the Jewish Resettlement), and which is also referred to as Der Führer schenkt den Juden eine Stadt (The Führer Gives the Jews a City), were destroyed. Gerron's notes that he wrote during the filming survived. Today the film exists only in fragmentary form. A 23-minute film, without subtitles, is available for educational use. The lists that Gerron wrote and edited during the filming survived

== Recognition ==
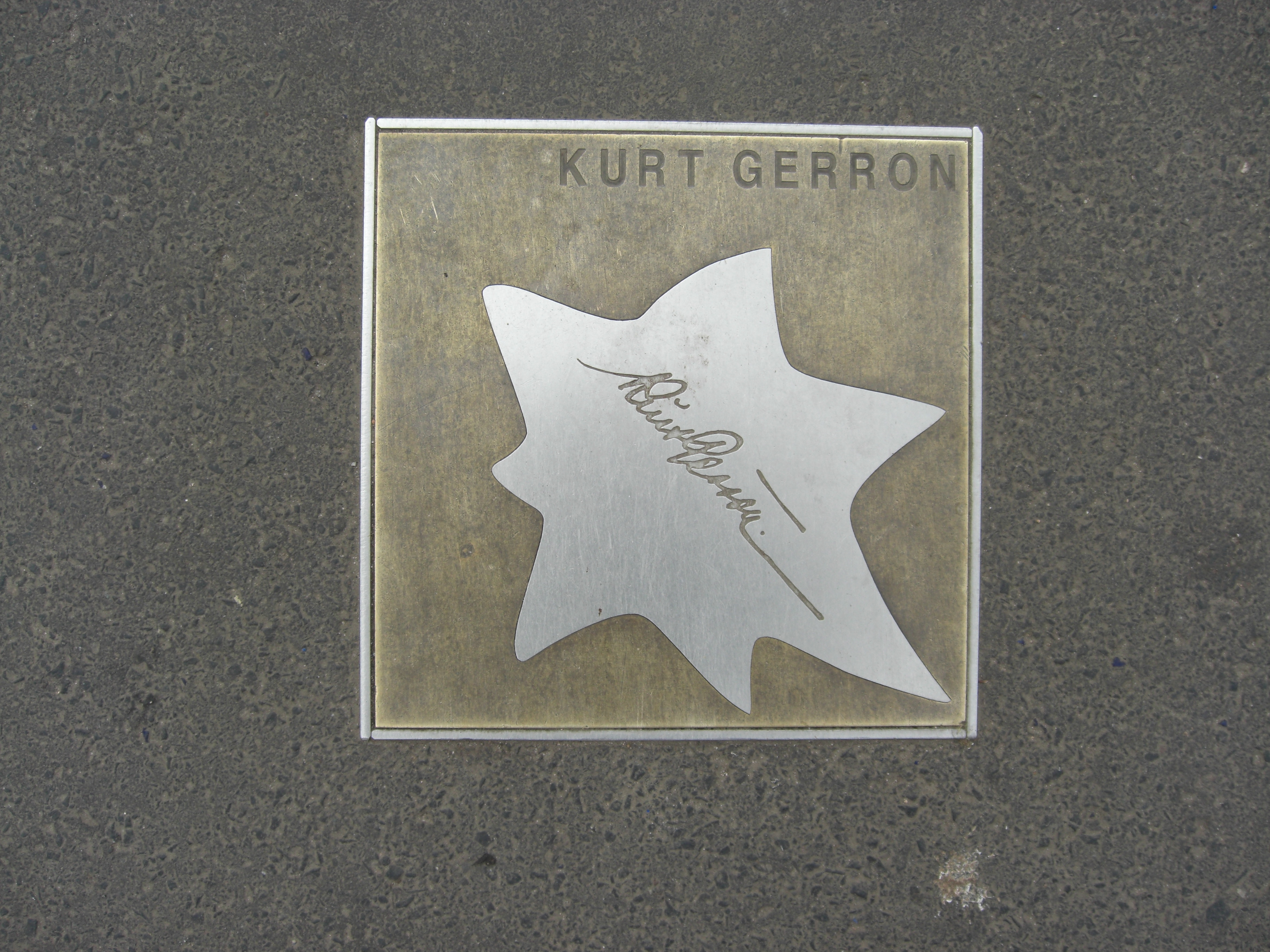
Gerron's star on the Walk of Fame of Cabaret in Mainz, Germany

There is a star for Gerron on the Walk of Fame of Cabaret in Mainz, Germany.

On 17 June 2022 a Stolperstein (memorial for victims of the Nazi regime) for Kurt Gerron and one for his wife, Olga Gerson, were installed at Paulsborner Strasse 77, Berlin, their last residence in Germany.

== Personal life ==
In 1924 he married Olga-Olly Meyer, later known as Olga Gerson-Meyer.

== In film and literature ==
Gerron is the subject of or features in several documentary films:

- Transport from Paradise (1962), an award-winning Czechoslovak film directed by Zbyněk Brynych and written by survivor Arnošt Lustig; later released on DVD accompanied by a booklet containing an essay by British writer Roy Kift
- Kurt Gerrons Karussell (1999), directed by Austrian Jewish documentary filmmaker Ilona Ziok starring Ute Lemper and Roy Kift
- Prisoner of Paradise (2002), directed by Malcolm Clarke and Stuart Sender;
- Tracks to Terezín (2007), which features Holocaust survivor Herbert Thomas Mandl talking about Gerron as the director of the film Theresienstadt. Ein Dokumentarfilm aus dem jüdischen Siedlungsgebiet

Roy Kift wrote a play about Gerron's time in Theresienstadt entitled Camp Comedy. The play is published in The Theatre of the Holocaust, Volume 2, edited by Robert Skloot and published by the University of Wisconsin Press in 1999.

The historical novel Gerron, written in German by Swiss author Charles Lewinsky and published in six languages, was shortlisted for the Swiss Book Prize in 2011.

The story of Gerron and the propaganda film is mentioned in Colum McCann's 2020 novel Apeirogon, about two men, one Palestinian, the other Israeli, who each lost a daughter in the ongoing Israeli–Palestinian conflict.

== See also ==
- Prisoner of Paradise, a 2002 documentary film about Gerron, a Canada/UK/US co-production

== Selected filmography ==
- The Haunting of Castle Kitay (1920)
- Varieté (1925)
- Semi-Silk (1925)
- Upstairs and Downstairs (1925)
- Oh Those Glorious Old Student Days (1925)
- White Slave Traffic (1926)
- The Three Mannequins (1926)
- Annemarie and Her Cavalryman (1926)
- Love's Joys and Woes (1926)
- Vienna - Berlin (1926)
- His Greatest Bluff (1927)
- Marie's Soldier (1927)
- The Bordello in Rio (1927)
- Dancing Vienna (1927)
- The Most Beautiful Legs of Berlin (1927)
- Benno Stehkragen (1927)
- Always Be True and Faithful (1927)
- Queen of the Boulevards (1927)
- Endangered Girls (1927)
- A Crazy Night (1927)
- A Serious Case (1927)
- The Lady with the Tiger Skin (1927)
- Break-in (1927)
- The Tragedy of a Lost Soul (1927)
- The White Spider (1927)
- Assassination (1927)
- The Transformation of Dr. Bessel (1927)
- The Duty to Remain Silent (1928)
- Casanova's Legacy (1928)
- Yacht of the Seven Sins (1928)
- Mariett Dances Today (1928)
- Life's Circus (1928)
- Under Suspicion (1928)
- Immorality (1928)
- The White Hell of Pitz Palu (1929)
- Revolt in the Batchelor's House (1929)
- We Stick Together Through Thick and Thin (1929)
- Diary of a Lost Girl (1929)
- Daughter of the Regiment (1929)
- People on Sunday (1930)
- Burglars (1930)
- Fairground People (1930)
- Dolly Gets Ahead (1930)
- Love in the Ring (1930)
- The Blue Angel (1930)
- The Three from the Filling Station (1930)
- Bombs on Monte Carlo (1931)
- My Wife, the Impostor (1931)
- Madame Pompadour (1931)
- Her Majesty the Barmaid (1931)
- A Night at the Grand Hotel (1931)
- Salto Mortale (1931)
- Road to Rio (1931)
- No Money Needed (1932)
- The White Demon (1932)
- Two in a Car (1932)
- Things Are Getting Better Already (1932)
- Narcotics (1932)
- A Mad Idea (1932)
- Today Is the Day (1933)
- Merijntje Gijzens Jeugd (Netherlands, 1936)
- The Three Wishes (Netherlands, 1937)
- The Three Wishes (Italy, 1937)
