= Wolf Gruner =

German historian (b. 1960)

Wolf Gruner (born 13 December 1960) is a German academic who has been the Founding Director of the Center for Advanced Genocide Research at the University of Southern California Shoah Foundation since 2014. He currently holds the Shapell-Guerin Chair in Jewish Studies and is also Professor of History at USC. Since 2017, he is a member of the Academic Advisory Committee of the Center for Advanced Holocaust Studies at the United States Holocaust Memorial Museum.

== Works ==
- Gruner, Wolf (2019). The Holocaust in Bohemia and Moravia: Czech Initiatives, German Policies, Jewish Responses. Berghahn Books. ISBN 978-1789202854.
- Gruner, Wolf (2015). Parias de la Patria: el mito de la liberación de los indígenas en la República de Bolivia (1825–1890) (in Spanish). La Paz: Editorial Plural.
- Gruner, Wolf (2014). The Persecution of the Jews in Berlin, 1933–1945: A Chronology of Measures by the Authorities in the German Capital. Berlin: Stiftung Topographie des Terrors. ISBN 978-3941772144.
- Gruner, Wolf (2006). Jewish Forced Labor Under the Nazis: Economic Needs and Racial Aims, 1938–1944. Cambridge: Cambridge University Press. ISBN 978-0521838757.

== Edited ==
- Gruner, Wolf; Pearce, Caroline (2019). German Reich 1933–1937. The Persecution and Murder of the European Jews by Nazi Germany, 1933–1945. Vol. 1. Berlin: Walter de Gruyter GmbH & Co KG. ISBN 978-3110435191.
- Gruner, Wolf; Osterloh, Jörg, eds. (2015). The Greater German Reich and the Jews: Nazi Persecution Policies in the Annexed Territories 1935–1945. War and Genocide. Translated by Heise, Bernard. New York: Berghahn Books. ISBN 978-1782384441.
- Gruner, Wolf; Ross, Steven, eds. (2019). New Perspectives on Kristallnacht: After 80 Years, the Nazi Pogrom in Global Comparison (Casden Annual, Vol. 17). West Lafaeyette, IN: Purdue University Press. ISBN 978-1557538703.
