= Malcolm Clarke (filmmaker) =

British filmmaker

- Occupation: filmmaker

Malcolm Clarke is an English filmmaker who works in China.

== Early life ==
Malcolm Clarke grew up in England.

== Career ==
Malcolm Clarke has been making films since the 1980s, first in his native England and later in the US and China.

He has worked as a script-doctor for the Hollywood studios and streaming services.

From 2014, Clarke shifted the focus of his work to China, and he was invited to serve as the chairman of the jury in the documentary section of the Shanghai International Film Festival. He later sat on the jury for the Tiantan Awards at the Beijing International Film Festival.

Clarke's films have focused on the challenges of the China-US relationship, China's handling of the COVID-19 pandemic, its Xiao kang poverty alleviation initiative, and the 2019 Anti-Extradition Amendment Bill protests in Hong Kong.

Clarke has been creating two screenplays: Drive Like a Girl and A Day to Remember, both contemporary Chinese stories based on real events.

He is now working for ARTeFACT Entertainment, a media company located in Shanghai, China, founded by Chinese producer Han Yi.

== Awards and recognition ==
Prisoner of Paradise (2002), co-directed by Clarke and Stuart Sender, was joint winner of the Kodak Award for Best Documentary on Film in the 2003 Grierson Awards. The film received a nomination for Best Feature Documentary at the 75th Academy Awards. Clarke and co-director Stuart Sender were also nominated for a 2003 Directors Guild of America Award.

Clarke's work has also won awards from the WGA, Emmy Awards, and the Overseas Press Club of America.
