= Prisoner of Paradise (2002 film) =

2002 documentary film by Malcolm Clarke and Stuart Sender

- DVD cover
- Directed by: Malcolm Clarke; Stuart Sender
- Produced by: Karl-Eberhard Schäfer
- Distributed by: Menemsha Entertainment (US); Odeon Films (Canada)
- Release dates: December 11, 2002 (U.S.); March 7, 2003 (Canada)
- Running time: 96 minutes
- Countries: Canada; United States; United Kingdom
- Language: English

Prisoner of Paradise is a 2002 documentary film directed by Malcolm Clarke and Stuart Sender. The film is an international co-production of Canada, the United States, and the United Kingdom, and tells the true story of Kurt Gerron, a German-Jewish cabaret and film actor and director in the 1920s and 1930s who was deported to the Theresienstadt concentration camp in Czechoslovakia during World War II. There, Gerron was ordered to write and direct a Nazi propaganda film, Theresienstadt. Ein Dokumentarfilm aus dem jüdischen Siedlungsgebiet, before being deported to Auschwitz concentration camp, where he and his wife Olga were murdered on 30 October 1944.

Prisoner of Paradise received mostly positive reviews and was nominated for Best Documentary Feature at the 75th Academy Awards. Clarke won an award from the Directors Guild of Canada for his work on the film, and he and Sender were together nominated for Outstanding Directing – Documentaries at the 55th Directors Guild of America Awards.

== Synopsis ==
The documentary is a chronicle of the life and career of Kurt Gerron. During the 1920s and early 1930s, Gerron was a well-known cabaret and film actor in Berlin. He sang the song "Mack the Knife" in the initial production of Brecht's The Threepenny Opera and appeared in a supporting role in Josef von Sternberg's classic German sound film The Blue Angel, co-starring Marlene Dietrich. When the Nazis came to power, Gerron remained in Germany, in spite of serious warnings by von Sternberg and Peter Lorre that he should leave the country.

Later, Gerron moved to Paris and Amsterdam in order to continue his entertainment career. He was captured by the Nazis in 1943 and sent with other Jews to the Theresienstadt concentration camp located near Prague. In 1944, the Nazis promoted this as a model settlement where the Jews were being well-treated and allowed a visit from the International Red Cross, to placate the Danish government. That year, the Nazis recruited Gerron to write and direct a 23-minute propaganda film, Theresienstadt. It presented the concentration camp as a "wonderful" place. Despite his cooperation, Gerron and his wife were subsequently included in the liquidation of the ghetto and deported to Auschwitz concentration camp, where they were both murdered.

== Production and release ==
Prisoner of Paradise was produced for the Cineplex Odeon Films presentation in Canada; the film is a Montreal production, in association with BBC, PBS, SODEC, and the Canadian cable television specialty channel History Television. The script was written by Malcolm Clarke and the film was narrated by Ian Holm. The documentary was released theatrically on December 12, 2003. A DVD version was released on April 12, 2005.

== Reception ==
=== Critical reaction ===
The documentary received generally positive reviews by the press. Metacritic gave Prisoner of Paradise a score of 70 out of 100, based on 13 critics, indicating "generally favorable reviews". Prisone of Paradise has an approval rating of 82% on review aggregator website Rotten Tomatoes, based on 28 reviews, and an average rating of 7.08/10.

Variety called the film "an important and smoothly mounted meditation on moral choices within the entertainment biz."

Charlotte Observer 's reviewer Lawrence Toppman praised the film, stating that "its uniqueness lies in its juxtaposition of happy faces and unhappy realities, of fleeting expressions of art and culture undone by daily brutality." The press widely agreed that the documentary exploited a new and unexpected aspect of the Nazi war against the Jews. Owen Gleiberman of Entertainment Weekly gave the film a B, and added that the film "reveal[ed] a queasy corner of the Nazi mind that tried to imagine a concentration camp as it fantasized the inmates might have." According to The Hollywood Reporter, the distinction between Prisoner of Paradise and previous films of the same topic is that "it tells a morality tale of a man whose hubris partially led to his downfall and whose willingness to work for his Nazi overseers resulted in one of the most notorious propaganda films of the era."

Along with the good reviews, Prisoner of Paradise was mildly criticized for its analysis of why Gerron agreed to direct the Nazi propaganda film of the camp. The New York Times commented that the film "seems to just drift to a close rather than pronounce an end. This can be a result of wrestling with a daunting subject and not being up to its demands."

=== Nominations and awards ===
The film received a nomination for Best Feature Documentary at the 75th Academy Awards.

Director Malcolm Clarke won the Directors Guild of Canada Award.

Clarke and Stuart Sender were also nominated for the 2003 Directors Guild of America Award.

Prisoner of Paradise was joint winner (with Storyville) of the Kodak Award for Best Documentary on Film in the 2003 Grierson Awards,
