= Natascha Drubek =

German film scholar

Natascha Drubek-Meyer (Drubek) is a researcher, author and editor in the area of Central and East European literature, film and media. Since 2012 Drubek has been teaching comparative literature, and film and media studies, at the Free University of Berlin (in 2020-21 as professor of the FONTE-Stiftung].

Drubek is one of the developers of Hyperkino and the editor-in-chief of the open-access academic journal Apparatus. From 2003 until 2014 she was the editor of the film and screen media section of ARTmargins, a journal for contemporary Central and Eastern European visual culture. From 2009 to 2015 Drubek was a Heisenberg fellow of the Deutsche Forschungsgeminschaft at the University of Regensburg pursuing two projects: Soviet antireligious films and campaigns and the film projects in the Theresienstadt concentration camp. In 2014, during her Heisenberg fellowship she organized a conference on film propaganda in Theresienstadt concentration camp. In 2016, Drubek published a selection of the conference proceedings as a double special issue of Apparatus. She holds a PhD from LMU Munich (with a thesis on Nikolai Gogol) where she was also habilitated with a monograph on the cultural history of early Russian film centering on the Russian pre-revolutionary director Evgenii Bauer (Russisches Licht. Von der Ikone zum frühen sowjetischen Kino, 2012). Her other research interests include Fyodor Dostoyevsky, Andrei Platonov, Vladimir Sorokin, and Jana Černá, born Krejcarová.

== Film studies, curator, digital editions ==
Next to her university career, in the 1990s Drubek was a freelance at the Munich Film Museum where she curated Russian and East European film seasons.

In 2004 she was awarded the Feodor-Lynen Research Grant of the Alexander von Humboldt Foundation to conduct research on early cinema in Russia where she benefitted from the guidance of her Moscow mentor, Naum Kleiman. Her next project grew out of a cooperation with the NIIK, the Research Institute of Film Art in Degtiarnyi pereulok, Moscow. It was a Marie Curie Fellowship at the Film School FAMU in Prague with the project: "Hypertextual Film Presentation. Digital Editions for the European Cinematographic Heritage" (2006-2008). With film historian Nikolai Izvolov, head of film history at NIIK, Natascha Drubek co-authored the method Hyperkino. Hyperkino is a standardized system of annotating films on digital carriers - attaching related content and analysis to individual frames. The pilot DVD of Alexander Hackenschmied's Aimless Walk (1930) – finished in 2008 – was never published. A version of Drubek's annotations appeared in the journal Bohemia. In 2012, in cooperation with Izvolov, Drubek published the Hyperkino the ibook "Happiness" (on Aleksandr Medvedkin's 1934 film Happiness), the first scholarly filmbook with moving images. Drubek served as a member of film festival juries at Docaviv (2016), Pula (2017), and Karlovy Vary International Film Festival (2012, 2014, 2018).

== Editorial and academic publishing activities, open access ==
- 1995-2003: editor of film section Balagankino of the theatre and drama journal Balagan, Potsdam & Regensburg.
- 2003-2014: editor of the film and screen media section of ARTMargins.
- With Georg Witte and Jurij Murasov Drubek co-edits the series "osteuropa medial", published by Böhlau
- From 2015: editor-in-chief of Apparatus, a multilingual academic peer reviewed online journal, available in open access

== Bibliography ==
- Drubek-Meyer, Natascha. 1998. Gogol's "eloquentia corporis": Einverleibung, Identität und die Grenzen der Figuration. München, Otto Sagner.
- co-edited with P. Kosta, H. Meyer. 1999. Juden und Judentum in Literatur und Film des slavischen Sprachraums: Die geniale Epoche. Wiesbaden.
- Mácha Karel Hynek (translated and edited by Natascha Drubek-Meyer). 2000. Die Liebe ging mit mir ...: Prosa, Poesie, Tagebücher. Tschechische Bibliothek.
- co-edited with Ju. Murašov. 2010. Das Zeit-Bild im osteuropäischen Film, nach 1945. Köln.
- Drubek, Natascha. 2012. Russisches Licht. Von der Ikone zum frühen sowjetischen Kino. Böhlau.
- Drubek, Natascha (ed.) 2016. Ghetto Films and their Afterlife. Special Issue of Apparatus. Film, Media and Digital Cultures in Central and Eastern Europe 2-3. https://dx.doi.org/10.17892/app.2016.0002
- Drubek-Meyer, Natascha. 2020. Filme über Vernichtung und Befreiung. Die Rhetorik der Filmdokumente aus Majdanek 1944-1945. Wiesbaden: Springer VS.
