= Hans Günther (SS officer) =

German SS officer (1910–1945)

Hans Günther (22 August 1910 – 5 May 1945) was an SS-Sturmbannführer who was the head of the "Central Office for Jewish Emigration in Prague" during World War II. He was in charge of the deportation of Czech Jews to death camps during the Holocaust. He was killed by Czech partisans in 1945.

== Career ==
Günther worked as an accountant until 1931. He joined the Sturmabteilung (SA) in November 1928, rising quickly to become SA leader in March 1929. From April 1931, he was a member of the Freiwilligen Arbeitsdienstes volunteer service, which he headed from 1932 to 1933. From September 1935 Günther was employed by the Gestapo as a detective in Erfurt, where he became responsible with his brother Rolf Günther for issues related to the so-called "Jewish question". After 1937, Günther and his brother joined the "Central Office for Jewish Emigration in Vienna". While his brother Rolf later worked under Adolf Eichmann in the Reich Security Main Office (RSHA) as deputy director of the "Jewish Department", Hans was promoted in July 1939 to head of the "Central Office for Jewish Emigration" in Prague (later renamed the "Central Office for the Settlement of the Jewish Question"). He remained in the post until early May 1945. His role was to organise the "final solution" in Prague, and was given instructions concerning the true meaning of this by Eichmann and Reinhard Heydrich. His responsibilities were the maintenance of anti-Jewish regulations in the Protectorate of Bohemia and Moravia, as well as deportations of Czech Jews to the ghetto in Theresienstadt and from there to the extermination camps. The prisoners in the camp called him the "smiling executioner".

=== Theresienstadt film ===
In order to counter Allied propaganda about the concentration camps Günther commissioned a film, "Theresienstadt", about the "Jewish area of settlement", portraying an idealised image of well-fed and housed Jews. The film was made during the late summer of 1944 and completed in March 1945. Kurt Gerron, a Jewish actor/director, made the film in return for a promise that he and his family would live. Shortly after he finished shooting the film, however, both he and his family were "evacuated" to Auschwitz where they were gassed upon arrival.

The film was intended for foreign audiences, but as it was completed shortly before the collapse of Nazi Germany, it was only seen by a few representatives of foreign organizations. Günther also set up a museum of Jewish artefacts in Prague containing items from destroyed synagogues.

=== Death ===
In May 1945, when the Prague uprising broke out, Günther, travelling with a heavily armed motorcade, was stopped at a roadblock near Beroun by Czech partisans. He was arrested and disarmed. According to the partisans, he attempted to grab a weapon from a guard and was mortally wounded in the ensuing struggle when he was injured by a hand-grenade; he later died from his injuries. The Czech authorities later accepted this account of his death, which was given to the German judicial authorities.
