= Willy Conley =

Willy Conley (born August 5, 1958, in Baltimore, Maryland, USA) is an American deaf photographer, playwright, actor and writer.

== Education ==
In 1981, Conley received a Bachelor of Science in Biomedical Photographic Communications at the Rochester Institute of Technology in Rochester (New York).

In 1982, he became a Registered Biological Photographer after advanced studies at the University of Texas Medical Branch's Pathology Photography Department in conjunction with the Biological Photographic Association, Galveston, Texas.

In 1991, He studied under the Caribbean poet Derek Walcott (Nobel Prize for Literature 1992) in creative writing and playwriting at Boston University (Massachusett) and received his Master of Arts.

In 1998, he received a Master of Fine Arts in Interdisciplinary/Intercultural Theatre from Towson University in Towson (Maryland).

== Works ==
=== Artistic activities ===
Conley is the most widely produced, living deaf playwright; his plays explore a broad palette – from the Deaf perspective – of circumstances with and without hearing characters, allowing Deaf characters to interact minus the direct influence that the dominant (hearing) culture might exert. Conley, now retired, was a full professor and former chairperson of the Theatre Arts Department at Gallaudet University in Washington, D.C. Conley was an Associate Artist with CenterStage in Baltimore (Maryland) for ten years, and an Affiliate Artist with Quest Visual Theatre (now defunct) in Lanham, (Maryland).

== Awards ==
- One-Act Play Award, The Sam Edwards Deaf Playwrights Competition for the play "The Hearing Test" 1990.
- American Deaf Drama Award for the plays "Broken Spokes" and "The Hearing Test" 1990.
- The Laurent Clerc Fund for Cultural Advancement for the play "The water falls", Gallaudet University 1996.
- First place at the "Lamia Ink! 8th Annual International One-Page Play Festival", New York 1998.
- PEW/Theatre Communications Group National Theatre Artist Residency Program grant(in conjunction with Center Stage Theatre in Baltimore) for the play "Falling on Hearing Eyes" 1999.
- VSA 2000 Playwrights Discovery Award 2000.
- Nominee for Outstanding Artist, Governor's Arts Award at ArtSalute, The State of Maryland and Maryland Citizens for the Arts Foundation 2002.
- Nominee for the National American College Theatre Festival selection for the play "Goya: en la Quinta del Sordo (in the house of the deaf man)" 2008.

== Published writings ==
- "It Could've Happened to Anyone (anyone that is deaf)", Symposium Magazine, Spring 1981, Vol. II #2.
- "Island of Intrique", In between Magazine, February 1984, 20 – 22.
- "Warm and Inspiring" NTID Focus, Fall 1986, 19.
- "A Photographic Memory" Kaleidoscope – an international magazine of fine arts, literature, and disability, No. 18, Winter/Spring 1989, 16 – 18
- "Day 57 – On the Road With the National Theatre of the Deaf", Uncharted, Vol. 5, No. 4, Fall 1990, 4 – 8.
- "Kindergarten To College – a personal narrative", Post-Secondary Education and the Hearing Impaired Student, London, England: Routledge Publishers; 1991.
- "The Hearing Test" (one-act play). "The Seawall." "One Frame Per Second." No Walls of Stone: an anthology of literature by Deaf and Hard-of-Hearing Writers, Gallaudet University Press; 1993.
- "Day 57." article quoted, Pictures in the Air, Stephen C. Baldwin, 45, 46 Gallaudet University Press; 1993.
- "The Horn." Hearing Health. Vol. 12, No. 5, Sep–Oct 1996, 9–10.
- "Coyote Bones." Modern Haiku. Winter-Spring 1997, 6.
- "Olives." Hearing Health. Vol. 14, No. 6, Nov–Dec. 1998, 40–41.
- "Disconnected." Lamia Ink!; January 1998, 4.
- "In Search of the Perfect Sign Language Script – insights into the diverse writing styles of Deaf playwrights." Deaf World. Lois Bragg, ed; NYU Press, 2001; 147–161.
- "Away from Invisibility Towards Invincibility: Issues of Deaf Theatre Artists in America." Deaf World. Lois Bragg, ed.; NYU Press, 2001; 51–67.
- "From Lipreading Ants to Flying Over Cuckoo Nests." American Theatre. April 2001, 34–37, 60–61.
- "The Loneliest Game in the World." Hearing Health; summer 2001.
- "Life is Short: Autobiography as Haiku; The Washington Post; Oct 28, 2001, F1.
- "Bicyclists Welcome." The Baltimore Sun; Mar 10, 2002, 3R.
- "The water falls. – a play" The Tactile Mind; Autumn 2002, 22–77.
- "Every Man Must Fall." "Salt in the Basement." "The Cycle of the X-Ray Technician." "The Perfect Woman." The Deaf Way II Anthology; 2002, 171–188.
- "Sifting Dirt." The Tactile Mind; Winter 2002– 2003, 12–19.
- "Broken Spokes – a play." The Tactile Mind; 2003.
- "Olives." The Tactile Mind; Spring 2003, 33–39.
- "The Universal Drum – a visual poem with drum accompaniment." Theatre for Young Audiences Today; v17, n2, 2003, 10.
- "America Needs More Visual Theatre!" Opening Stages; The Kennedy Center; Mar. 2005; 10–12.
- "Untitled." Stages of Transformation: Collaborations of the National Theatre Artist Residency Program; Charlotte Stoudt, ed; Theatre Communications Group, 2005; 113.
- "The Face of Grace." Urbanite; Dec. 2006; 25.
- "Signing the Body Poetic." University of California Press; Chapter 10: Visual Screaming: Willy Conley's Deaf Theater and Charlie Chaplin's Silent Cinema by Carol Robinson; writings quoted (195–215); video interview in enclosed book DVD; 2007.
- "With Enthusiasm – All Things Great." Journal of Deaf Studies and Deaf Education; Book Review, Feb 25, 2008; 0: enn002v1-enn002.
- "Deaf American Poetry." John Lee Clark, ed.; Gallaudet University Press; poems; 2009; 190–197.
- "Vignettes of the Deaf Character and Other Plays." Twelve plays by Willy Conley; Gallaudet University Press; 2009.
- Characters in El Paso, The Ear. "Deaf American Prose." Kristen Harmon, Jennifer Nelson, eds.; Gallaudet University Press; 2012; 190–197.
- Sifting Dirt. "Daring to Repair Anthology." Wising Up Press; 2012; 221–226.
- Sifting Dirt, The Ivoryton Inn. "Deaf Lit Extravaganza." Handtype Press; 2013; 5–9, 109–111.
- "The Deaf Heart – a novel." Gallaudet University Press; 2015
- The Ear. "Tripping the Tale Fantastic." Handtype Press; 2017; 21–34.
- "Listening Through the Bone – Collected Poems." Gallaudet University Press; 2019
- "Visual-Gestural Communication – a Workbook in Nonverbal Expression and Reception." Routledge/Taylor & Francis; 2019
- The Label. "This Is What America Looks Like: Poetry and Fiction from DC, Maryland and Virginia." Washington Writer's Publishing House. 2021; 197–198.

== Theatre plays ==
- "Broken Spokes" - Ethnic Cultural Center and Theatre, University of Washington, Seattle, Washington; produced by Deaf Spotlight; November 8–10, 2013; Eastman Studio Theatre, Gallaudet University, Washington, D.C.; October 17–26, 2013; NTID Performing Arts, 1510 Lab Theatre, Oct. 9–12, 2008; Royall Tyler Theatre, University of Vermont, Burlington; April 28, 29, 2001; Bailiwick Repertory Theatre; Chicago, IL; Oct.14-Nov. 8, 1998; Boston Center for the Arts, Boston, MA, as part of the NeWorks '97 Festival; Jan 23–26, 1997; Callier Theatre of the Deaf, University of Texas, Dallas, Sep 7-29-90 [American Deaf Drama Award Winner]; Peter Xantho Theatre, one-act production, New York Deaf Theatre; New York, NY; January 18–22, 1990.
- "The Hearing Test" Boston Playwrights Theatre, Boston University (under the direction of Derek Walcott), 1991.
- "Olives" 10th Annual NeWorks Theatre Festival, New Theatre, Boston, 1999.
- "Disconnected" directed by Herbert Gantschacher and performed at The First European and International Deaf Theatre Festival presented by ARBOS – Company for Music and Theatre at the Theater des Augenblicks 2000, Vienna, Austria; included a tour in Vienna and Salzburg(Austria).
- "The Fallout Shelter" The John F. Kennedy Center Theatre Lab, Washington, D.C., 2000 [Finalist: VSA 2000 Playwrights Discovery Award].
- "Falling on Hearing Eyes: a museum of Sign /anguish for People with Communication Disorders" Amaryllis Theatre Company & National Theatre of the Deaf, Philadelphia and Deaf Way II, Washington, D.C., 2002.
- "Goya – en la Quinta del Sordo (in the house of the deaf man)"; Studio Theatre, Towson University (Questfest 2008), Rauh Studio Theatre, Carnegie Mellon University (American College Theatre Festival Region II winner), January 5, 2008; Black Box Theatre, Gallaudet University Theatre Arts Department, November 8–18, 2007 and March 1, 2, 3, 8, 9, 2002 (early version of the play); Deaf Way II, Washington D.C., July 8 – 12, 2002.
- "The water falls." Quest: Arts for Everyone; Olney Theater Center for the Arts, 2003.; Chelsea Playhouse, NY, NY by New York Deaf Theatre, June 3—22, 1997.
- "Oh, Figaro!" (co-written with John Augustine) National Theatre of the Deaf, Hartford, 35th Anniversary National Tour; 2003.
- "Tales from India" Imagination Stage, Deaf Access Company; Bethesda, MD 2004.
- For Every Man, Woman, and Child — Kent Trumbull Theatre, Kent State University; Sep. 25, 26, & 27; October 3, 4, & 5, 2009; 24th International Conference on Medievalism, Siena College Loudonville, New York; Oct 9, 2009; Elstad Auditorium, Washington, D.C., Gallaudet University Theatre Arts Department; Nov. 12–20, 1999 [full-length modern adaptation based on Everyman]
- "The Universal Drum" Imagination Stage, Bethesda, 2004; directed by Herbert Gantschacher and performed at The Eleventh European and International Deaf Theatre Festival presented by ARBOS - Company for Music and Theatre at the Tanz Atelier 2011, Vienna(Austria); Dixon Place, produced by Sign & Sing Company, NY, NY; 01/13/2018.
- The Deaf Chef – Visible Impact, Devine Studio Theatre, Georgetown University; October 21, 2011.

== Literature ==
- Carol Robinson "Visual Screaming: Willy Conley's Deaf Theater and Charlie Chaplin's Silent Cinema", 2007.
