= Paul Kling =

Canadian Violinist

Paul Kling (28 March 1929 – 2 January 2005) was a Czech-born Canadian violinist and Holocaust survivor.

== Early life ==
Kling was born in Opava on 28 March 1929. He was a gifted musician very early in life, and by age seven he had performed Mozart's A Major Violin Concerto and Bach's A Minor Violin Concerto with the Vienna Symphony Orchestra. In 1941, several months before the thirteen-year-old Kling was to receive the equivalent of a bachelor's degree in musical theory, he was expelled from school for being an 'undesirable element' and associated with the Jewish community.

== Life in the camps ==
On 28 September 1944, Kling was transported to Auschwitz concentration camp, but survived. He was sent to Theresienstadt concentration camp at the age of 14, where he was chosen to perform in Viktor Ullmann's opera The Emperor of Atlantis, or The Disobedience of Death. The opera was rehearsed in 1944 at Theresienstadt, but was not performed before the camp was closed. After guards determined the political subtext of the play, he and the other members of the orchestra were disbanded and sent to Auschwitz. With the exception of Kling and one other member, the entire company died. Among his projects in later life was educating others about music during the Holocaust, and sharing information about his experiences in Theresienstadt.

== Post-war life ==
After the war, he became concertmaster of the NHK Symphony Orchestra and the Louisville Orchestra,, where he played as part of the Louisville String Quartet alongside with renowned musicians Peter McHugh (violin), Virginia Schneider (viola), and Guillermo Helguera (cello).. He taught at the University of Victoria, British Columbia, Canada for 20 years, and later became a professor emeritus and director of the music school (1980–87). He later taught violin at the University of British Columbia.

In 1995, The Emperor of Atlantis was performed for the first time at Theresienstadt in a production of ARBOS - Company for Music and Theatre. In 1996, the original score was presented at the National Arts Centre in Ottawa (Canada) as part of "The Triumph of the Human Spirit!" for the first time with the survivors from Theresienstadt, Kling, and Herbert Thomas Mandl contributing to the project.

Kling died in Victoria, BC on 2 January 2005 at age 75. He was married to Japanese harpist Taka Kling.
