= Arbos – Company for Music and Theatre =

Disability organization based in Austria

ARBOS – Company for Music and Theatre in Vienna, Salzburg and Klagenfurt, is a society specialized in the realisation of new forms of theatre especially of projects for contemporary new music theatre, scenic concerts, theatre for young people, theatre concerts, deaf theatre, directed space, theatrical exhibitions and other forms of the arts (crossover projects).

== Awards ==
ARBOS got awards for the following projects:

- "The Emperor of Atlantis" written by Viktor Ullmann (music) and Petr Kien (libretto): music theatre production of the year 1993 in Prague (selected by an independent jury of music and theatre experts for the Czech Theatre Magazine "Divadelni Noviny"). This production was presented until now in Washington D.C. (United States Holocaust Memorial Museum), Los Angeles (US), Ottawa, Montreal (Canada), Stockholm (Sweden), Terezín, Prague (Czech Republic), Dresden (Germany), Hallein, Vienna and also in Klagenfurt.
- "Kar" music theatre for the mountains written by Herbert Lauermann (music) and Christian Fuchs (libretto) produced and presented inside the dam of the Großer Mühldorfer See in 2300 meter above sea level in the mountains of the Reißeck in Carinthia: MAECENAS-Award 1994 for the best art sponsoring-project in Austria.
- "Different Trains" three operas dealing with the Holocaust in a moving train through Europe in stations in Belgium, Germany, Czech Republic, Slovakia, Hungary and Austria: ARTECO-Award 1999.
- European Artprize of the Financial Times (Cerec-Award) for the projects "Kar" music theatre for the mountains, "Inukshuk" the arctic-alpine art- und theatre project and the European Deaf Theatre concept.
- "I can see something You cannot see" deaf theatre play for children for deaf and hearing children, parents, relatives and teachers: EUROPASIEGEL 2002 for innovative language projects.
- "Theatre traps in the subway of Vienna" visible and invisible theatre in the stations of the subway lines U 1, U 2, U 3, U 4 and U 6: MAECENAS-Award 2002.
- "Speaking Hands" deaf theatre workshop project: EUROPASIEGEL 2002 for innovative language projects.
- "Dada in Tramline 1 and Tramline 2" visible and invisible theatre at stations of the tramlines 1 & 2 in Vienna: MAECENAS-Award 2003.
- Nomination for the Bank Austria Art Prize 2012.
- Award of The UNESCO for the Visual Theatre Library for the "development of human rights for all"
- Award by the Federal Minister Gabriele Heinisch-Hosek for the theatre project "Sense of Touch - Sense of Smell - Sense of Taste" about the culture and communication techniques of the deaf-blind with deaf-blind students and five sensed students in 2014

== Artistic concepts and productions ==
- "Dialogues on the Border" a trilogy of the dramas "Al-Mukaffa", "The Delighted Angel" and "The Strangers" by Dževad Karahasan presented in Washington, D.C. (US), Prague (Czech Republic), Erfurt (Germany), Vienna, Salzburg, Krems, Hallein and Klagenfurt (Austria).
- "The Stories about Voyages" a music theatre trilogy "The Singing of The Fools about Europe", "The Concert of Birds" and "UROBOS : Project Time" by Dževad Karahasan and Herbert Gantschacher produced and presented in Odesa (Ukrainia), Prague, Hradec Kralove (Czech Republic), Berlin, Erfurt, Leipzig (Germany), Klagenfurt, Salzburg, Hallein (Austria) and Singapore (Singapore Arts Festival 2001).
- "Tracks to Viktor Ullmann" – The Viktor Ullmann Project with the productions "The Emperor of Atlantis", "The Lay Of The Love And Death Of Cornet Christoph Rilke" (directed in two productions one for piano and one for orchestra), "The Strange Passenger", "The Broken Jug" in the Czech Republic, Austria, US and Canada.
- "War = daDa" Art and War in the mirror of the 20th century from the war on the Balkans 1912–1913 to The Great War 1914–1918 to The Great War 1939–1945 to the war on the Balkans in 1991–1999; the 20th century was the bloodiest one in the history of mankind. Performances and conferences and exhibitions(including plays of Herbert Thomas Mandl and Dževad Karahasan or music of Viktor Ullmann) in Austria, Italy, Slovenia, Hungary, Germany and Poland.
- "Viktor Ullmann - Witness and Victim of the Apocalypse" - The Austrian Viktor Ullmann in the First World War as an artillery observer becomes a witness of the gas attack in the campaign of the theatre of war at the river Isonzo on 24th Oktober 1917 near Bovec (Flitsch/Plezzo) and in the Second World War becomes a victim by being murdered with gas on 18 October 1944 at Auschwitz - A research and exhibition project of Herbert Gantschacher with new documents and research work about the First World War, Films ("Viktor Ullmann - Tracks to the War Front 1917" by Herbert Gantschacher and Erich Heyduck; "Tracks to Terezin" by Herbert Gantschacher, Robert Schabus and Erich Heyduck) and new audio documents (Johann Ortner "As a soldier in The Great War 1914-1918"; Viktor Ullmann "The Emperor of Atlantis or The Disobedience of Death" documentary recording of the first performance ever at Terezin 1995 by ARBOS - Company for Music and Theatre) at the former monastery of Arnoldstein 2007 in Austria and at the documentary centre at Prora on the island of Rugen in Germany. The English and German Book about the exhibition was published in 2015. The Czech Version of the exhibition and the translation of the book was presented in 2015 under the Czech title "Viktor Ullmann - Svědek a oběť apokalypsy 1914–1944" by the City Archives of Prague in the Clam-Gallas Palace. The Russian version of the exhibition and the book was presented at the 28th International Music Festival "Sound Ways" at the House of Composers in St. Petersburg and in the Museum of the City and Rayon of Kingisepp in the Oblast Leningrad together with the translation of the book in Russian. The Slovenian version of the exhibition "Viktor Ullmann – Priča in žrtev apokalipse" is presented from 23 October 2018 to 18 October 2019 at the Goriški muzej in Kromberk in Nova Gorica in Slovenia, the Slovenian translation of the book was published too.

== Partners ==
Cooperation partners and Performances of ARBOS are in 32 countries on four continents in Australia, Asia (National Arts Festival in Singapore, one of the most important Art Festivals in Asia and in Hong Kong), America (U.S. Holocaust Memorial Museum in Washington, D.C., Holocaust Museum in Los Angeles of the US and in Nunavik, Nunavut, Canada, Peru and Argentine) and Europe (Russia, Ukraine, Lithuania, Poland, Czech Republic, Slovakia, Hungary, Slovenia, Italy, Kosovo, Finland, Sweden, Norway, Iceland, Greenland, Denmark, Germany, France, Nederland, Belgium, Great Britain, Austria and Switzerland). Among the Project partners are the following institutions: Teatr 3 (Szczecin), Stiftung Neue Kultur (Berlin), Dokumentationszentrum Prora (Rügen), Ballet Unit Cramp Prague, Renaissance Foundation (Odesa), CINARS (Montreal), Kulturforum Hallein (Salzburg), Quest Visual Theatre (Maryland), Draumasmidjan (Reykjavik), Kulturhuset (Stockholm), Singapore Arts Festival.

== International Cooperation ==
ARBOS is member at the following international organisations:

- musica reanimata Berlin (working on Degenerate music)
- NewOp International Contemporary Music Theatre Conference
- Deaf Theatre Network Europe Vienna

== Literature about ARBOS ==
- Herbert Lauermann: "On my Desk". musica 4/1994, Bärenreiter-Edition, Kassel 1994, ISSN 0027-4518.
- Dževad Karahasan: "About Exile in an Open Society". Kulturkontakt, Vienna 1994.
- Federal Ministry for European and International Affairs: "Cultural Report 1996". Manz Edition, Vienna 1997, ISBN 3-214-08287-6.
- Marion Demuth and Udo Zimmermann: "Sound Space Movement - 10 Years of Artistic Work of the Dresden Institute for Contemporary Music". Breitkopf & Härtel Edition, Wiesbaden-Leipzig-Paris 1996 ISBN 3-7651-0331-4.
- Antonia Kriks: "Consume, Commerce, Culture - The Art of Sponsorship. Westdeutscher Rundfunk 1996.
- Franck Mallet: "Viktor Ullmann - The Emperor of Atlantis". Le Monde de la musique 195, Paris 1996.
- Jean-Jacques van Vlasselaer: "The Emperor of Atlantis". Die Brücke Nr.3, Klagenfurt 1996.
- Ekkehard Pluta: "Viktor Ullmann - The Emperor of Atlantis". Fonoforum, Unterschleißheim 1996, ISSN 0015-6140.
- Bernhard Günther (editor): "Encyclopedia of Contemporary Music in Austria". music information center Austria, Wien 1997 ISBN 3-901837-00-0.
- Wolfgang Freitag: "Arias on Rails". Österreichischer Akademischer Austauschdienst, Vienna 1998.
- "Tracks to Viktor Ullmann". Essays written by Viktor Ullmann, Herbert Thomas Mandl, Dževad Karahasan, Ingo Schultz and Herbert Gantschacher (edited by ARBOS / Vienna: edition selene 1998), ISBN 3-85266-093-9.
- Jean-Jacques Van Vlasselear: "Ullmann: de Terezin au Canada". Oe Culture, Edmonton 1998.
- Michael Ausserwinkler: "Culture Awards Speech". Manuscript, Klagenfurt 1998.
- Spyros Pappas: "Kaleidoscope Programme Report 1996-1998". European Communities, Luxembourg 1999 ISBN 92-828-4217-7.
- Federal Ministry for European and International Affairs: "Cultural Report 1998". Manz Edition, Vienna 1999 ISBN 3-214-08295-7.
- Gerhard Ruiss: "Spent Commitments". Autorensolidarität, Wien 1999.
- "Inukshuk - The Arctic Art & Music Project" edited by ARBOS, edition selene, Wien 1999. ISBN 3-85266-126-9.
- Federal Ministry for European and International Affairs: "Cultural Report 1999". Manz Edition, Vienna 2000 ISBN 3-214-08295-7.
- "Generalprogram" Kungliga Operan, Stockholm 2000/2001.
- Dietmar Jäger / Sabine Zeller: "A Language seen by everybody but not heard" @ cetera, St.Pölten 2001.
- Irene Suchy: "The Loneliness of the Composer". LADS, St.Pölten 2001.
- Jan Vičar: "IMPRINTS Essays on Czech Music and Aesthetics" - (Department of Musicology of Palacký University Faculty of Philosophy in Olomouc), ISBN 978-80-903589-0-4 (Togga), Olomouc 2005
- Amnesty International: "Commented list of Books written by critical, politically persecuted and exiled Authors". Berlin-Bonn 2007.
- Eva Zwick: "Hearing. 'Hearing Rooms' in Deaf Theatre". University Mozarteum Salzburg 2007.
- Dario Oliveri "Hitler regala una città agli ebrei" LÈPOS Società Editrice, ISBN 978-88-8302-358-3, Palermo 2008
- Jana Unuk: "The Vilenica 2010 Prize Winner Dževad Karahasan", pages 9, 13, 17 - 2010. ISBN 978-961-6547-50-5
