= Christel Loetzsch =

German opera singer

Christel Lötzsch (born 20 June, 1986, in Annaberg-Buchholz, known as Christel Loetzsch, is a German mezzo-soprano opera singer.

== Life and career ==
Loetzsch was born Christel Lötzsch in Annaberg-Buchholz in 1986, at the time still in the German Democratic Republic. She began her music education at the age of 7, attended the Musikgymnasium Helmholtz in Karlsruhe, and studied singing at the University of Music Franz Liszt Weimar starting in 2005. Loetzsch attended master classes and lessons with Brigitte Fassbaender, Gwyneth Jones, Manfred Jung and Catherine Foster. In 2018 she earned her Konzertexamen with Carola Guber at the University of Music and Theatre Leipzig.

=== Career ===
Loetzsch premiered Amalia in Ludger Vollmer's Schillers Räuber_Rap'n Breakdance Opera commissioned by the city of Jena in 2009. In the same year she received a stipend from the Richard-Wagner-Verband Weimar to attend the Bayreuth Festival. In Bayreuth she took part in the Cantilena Competition held by the Junge Musikerstiftung, and received another stipend that enabled her to study at the Conservatorio Giuseppe Verdi in Milan in 2010 to improve her Italian. In Italy Loetzsch participated in the singing competition "Giovani voci" Città di Magenta 2011, which led to a temporary engagement in the choir of the Teatro alla Scala, where she met conductor Nicola Luisotti who helped her to sign with a talent agency. This let to her debut in the soprano role Zerlina in Mozart's Don Giovanni at the Verona Arena in July 2012 under Daniel Oren, and to her engagement with the young artists ensemble of the Semperoper in Dresden in August.

In the Dresden young ensemble Loetzsch sang Tebaldo in Verdi's Don Carlos, the Mother in Stephen Oliver's one act opera Mario und der Zauberer, Hänsel in Hänsel und Gretel, Rosina in The Barber of Seville, Cherubino in The Marriage of Figaro, Oberto in Alcina. She made her US debut as Dorabella in Mozart's Così fan tutte at the San Francisco Opera under Luisotti in the summer of 2013. In her second year in the Semperoper young ensemble in the 2013/14 season she began to replace the umlaut ö in her last name (Lötzsch) with the digraph oe (Loetzsch), and sang Amelia's maid in Simon Boccanegra, and Ljusja in Moscow, Cheryomushki.

In 2015 Loetzsch joined the ensemble of Theater Altenburg Gera with debuts as Octavian in Der Rosenkavalier, Maddalena in Rigoletto, Nancy in Martha, oder Der Markt zu Richmond , Lyubov in Mazeppa (opera), Leokadja Begbick in Rise and Fall of the City of Mahagonny, Countess Viktoria in Viktoria und ihr Husar, as well as Brigitte in Hans Sommer's Rübezahl und der Sackpfeifer von Neiße. In 2019 she sang Fricka in Wagner's Der Ring des Nibelungen at the Landestheater Niederbayern. In the same year she sang one of the Three Weird Sisters in the world premiere of Pascal Dusapin's Macbeth Underworld at La Monnaie Opera House in Brussels, staged by Thomas Jolly, and conducted by Alain Altinoglu

In 2020 Loetzsch sang the title role in Dusapin's Penthesilea in a concert performances at the Philharmonie de Paris with the Orchestre de Paris. With the same orchestra she sang the soprano cantata Le Soleil des eaux by Pierre Boulez under the baton of Klaus Mäkelä in 2021. Also in 2021, she sang Arnold Schoenberg's Pierrot lunaire, Op. 21 with the Dresden Philharmonic under Marek Janowski. Loetzsch sang the Drummer in Viktor Ullmann's Der Kaiser von Atlantis with the Munich Radio Orchestra under the baton of Patrick Hahn, and jumped in as Fricka in Bern. She sang the Nurse in Richard Strauss' Die Frau ohne Schatten at Oper Frankfurt under Sebastian Weigle, and the young Dante in the world premiere of Dusapin's Il Viaggio, Dante under the baton of Kent Nagano at the Festival d'Aix-en-Provence. In late 2022 she sang Floßhilde in Wagner's Das Rheingold and Götterdämmerung, and Schwertleite in his Die Walküre in concert with the Dresden Philharmonic under Marek Janowski.

=== Teaching ===
Loetzsch is a lecturer in singing at the University of Music Franz Liszt Weimar, and was granted a three year stipend aimed at preparing female artists for an artistic professorship in 2021.

== Discography ==
- 2022: Der Kaiser von Atlantis. Munich Radio Orchestra with Patrick Hahn; BR Klassik (900339)
