= Der Kaiser von Atlantis =

1975 opera by Viktor Ullmann

- Opera by Viktor Ullmann
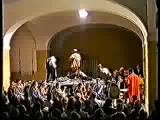
- A scene from the first performance at Terezín directed and produced by Herbert Gantschacher for ARBOS - Company for Music and Theatre, where the composition of the opera was finished in the concentration camp in 1943, performed on 23 May 1995
- Description: chamber opera in four scenes
- Translation: The Emperor of Atlantis or The Disobedience of Death
- Librettist: Peter Kien
- Language: German
- Premiere: 16 December 1975; De Nederlandse Opera, Amsterdam

Der Kaiser von Atlantis oder Die Tod-Verweigerung (The Emperor of Atlantis or The Disobedience of Death) is a one-act opera by Viktor Ullmann with a libretto by Peter Kien. They collaborated on the work while interned in the Nazi concentration camp of Theresienstadt (Terezín) around 1943. The Nazis did not allow it to be performed there, and the script was not finalized until the 1970s.

The world premiere, presented by the Netherlands Opera at the Bellevue Centre, Amsterdam, took place on 16 December 1975. It was conducted by Kerry Woodward using the first performing edition, which he had been actively involved in preparing.

The title is sometimes given as Der Kaiser von Atlantis, oder Der Tod dankt ab, that is, The Emperor of Atlantis, or Death Abdicates, and described as a "legend in four scenes" rather than an opera. It follows the personification of death as an overworked soldier, driven to abandon his duties by the senseless warmongering of the tyrannical Kaiser Overall.

== Composition history ==
About 1943, Ullmann and Kien were inmates at the Nazi concentration camp of Theresienstadt (Terezín) when they collaborated on the opera. It was rehearsed at Theresienstadt in March 1944, but the Nazi authorities interpreted the work's depiction of the character of the Kaiser as a satire on Adolf Hitler and did not allow it to be performed. Both the composer and the librettist were murdered in the Auschwitz concentration camp. Prior to his death, Ullmann had expressed that his time in Theresienstadt did not damper his creative drive. This sentiment is confirmed by Ullmann himself:

It should be emphasized that we by no means just sat lamenting by Babylon's rivers and that our will to culture was adequate to our will to live.

— Viktor Ullmann

Ullmann entrusted his manuscripts to a fellow-prisoner, Dr. Emil Utitz, a former Professor of Philosophy at the German University in Prague, who served as the camp's librarian. Utitz survived the camp and passed the manuscripts on to another survivor, Dr. Hans Gunther Adler, a friend of Ullmann's, some of whose poems Ullmann had set to music. The score was a working version with edits, substitutions, and alternatives made in the course of rehearsals. Dr. Adler deposited the original manuscripts and two copies of the libretto in his possession at the Goetheanum in Dornach, the center for the anthroposophical movement with which Ullmann was associated. The manuscripts subsequently passed to the Paul Sacher Stiftung in Basle. Peter Kien’s handwritten libretto is now held by the Wiener Holocaust Library in London, alongside other documents related to the creation of the opera.

== Performance history ==
=== First performing edition ===
Brochure of Der Kaiser von Atlantis featuring (clockwise from top left): Viktor Ullmann, Peter Kien, Aaron Kramer, and Kerry Woodward.

The first performing edition of the work was prepared between 1973 and 1975 by Kerry Woodward, a London-based musician and arranger who had a personal connection with the Adler family. Woodward worked through the nearly complete orchestra score, loose pages of additional music, and two copies of the libretto, one version in Ullmann’s handwriting and the other one typed. Woodward conducted the world premiere of the piece with the Dutch National Opera (DNO) on 16 December 1975 at the Theater Bellevue in Amsterdam, a production the company later took to Brussels for two performances in May 1976 and to Spoleto for four more the following month.

Using an English translation prepared by the poet Aaron Kramer, the San Francisco Spring Opera Theater led by Woodward presented the American premiere of the piece on 21 April 1977. Woodward also led the New York premiere with the New Opera Theatre at the Brooklyn Academy of Music on 19 May 1977 and five performances in Israel in May 1978. He continued to perform the work with the DNO both in Amsterdam the following month and at the Nottingham Playhouse in Nottingham, England a year later. In addition to these early stage performances, a feature film of the opera performed by the London Sinfonietta was released in 1977. John Goldschmidt directed the film, and the orchestra was led by Woodward and starred Teresa Stratas and Siegmund Nimsgern. The film won the Prix Italia (RAI Prize) a year later.

Towards the end of 1976 and into 1977, Woodward consulted Rosemary Brown, a prominent spiritualist known for mediumship with dead composers and for transcribing musical works they dictated. According to transcriptions of their sessions together, Brown claimed that she was in contact with Ullmann, who wanted to make changes in the score. Brown communicated these instructions to Woodward, who incorporated them into a revised edition for later performances. These changes included altering the instrumentation of the second part of Death's aria near the end of the opera, substituting strings for harpsichord and adding trumpet and flute.

=== Other performing editions and performances ===
In 1981, Michael Graubart and Nicholas Till prepared an edition based on the manuscripts in Dr. Adler's possession as well as on Woodward's edition, following many of Woodward's choices. That provided the basis for the British premiere at the Studio Theatre of London's Morley College on 15 May 1981 and for additional performances in May 1985 at the Imperial War Museum.

In 1988, London saw two productions; one from the Wiener Kammeroper at the Bloomsbury Festival on 11 May, and a second from Mecklenburg Opera at the Donmar Warehouse on 10 June. This was directed by John Abulafia with a new English translation by Sonja Lyndon and conducted by Anne Manson. The Mecklenburgh production was revived at the South Bank Centre and toured to Scotland, and won the Prudential Award. The 1993 BBC TV film 'The Music of Terezín' by Simon Broughton incorporated scenes from the Mecklenburgh production.

On behalf of Herbert Gantschacher, the artistic director of ARBOS - Company for Music and Theatre, Ingo Schultz worked on the reconstruction of the opera's original score between 1992 and 1993 in cooperation with Karel Berman, who rehearsed the role of Death at Terezín and had a copy of the score he had made by hand, Paul Kling, who was the concertmaster of the chamber-orchestra of the rehearsals at Terezín 1944, and Herbert Thomas Mandl. Herbert Gantschacher (Austria) staged this edition of the opera for ARBOS - Company for Music and Theatre in Austria, the Czech Republic (including the first performance at the concentration camp of Theresienstadt in 1995), Germany, Sweden, Canada, and the U.S. (including a performance at the U.S. Holocaust Memorial Museum)

Tomasz Konina directed the Polish premiere at Warsaw Chamber Opera in Warsaw in 2005.

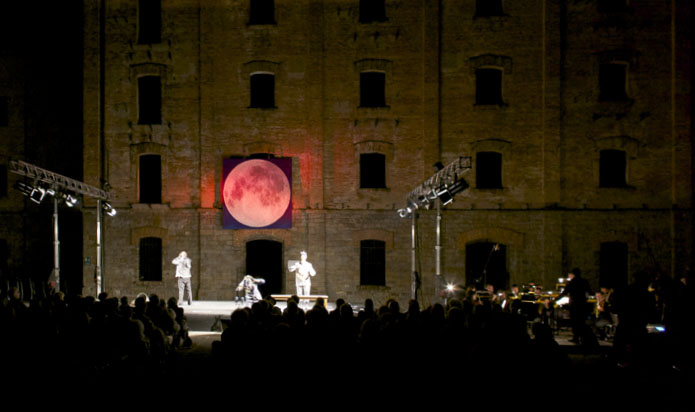
Der Kaiser von Atlantis, oder die Tod-Verweigerung, Triest 2012

Other performances have been given by Ravinia Festival at Temple Shalom in Chicago (2005), City Opera of Vancouver (2009), Long Beach Opera (2009), Boston Lyric Opera (2011), Dioneo Opera (Grimeborn, London, 2011), and English Touring Opera in London and locations throughout England (2012). It was presented in Denver, Colorado, by Central City Opera, in collaboration with other Denver organizations, in January 2013. The New Millennium Orchestra, in collaboration with the City of Chicago's Department of Cultural Affairs, presented the opera in March 2013 on the Pritzker stage of Millennium Park. It was performed in Melbourne at Monash University's Caulfield campus in July 2012 by IOpera, and by Perth Hebrew Congregation, Perth, Western Australia, in June 2014, by Lostandfound Opera Juilliard Opera Center performed the work (in a double bill with Poulenc's Les mamelles de Tirésias) in November 2015. The Dutch M31 Foundation made a small documentary with all the old cast members of the first performance and performed the work in 2016 with a new cast in several theatres in the Netherlands. In October 2020, the Atlanta Opera produced socially distanced performances of the work outdoors in a circus tent.

== Roles ==
The role names are given for both English and German. The name of the Emperor is intentionally foreign in both languages.

Roles, voice types, premiere casts
Role	Voice type	Theresienstadt rehearsals	Premiere cast 16 December 1975, Amsterdam	Premiere at Theresienstadt (51 years after the general rehearsal) 23 May 1995
Emperor Überall; Kaiser Overall	baritone	Walter Windholz	Meinard Kraak	Steven Swanson
The Loudspeaker; Der Lautsprecher	bass	Bedrich Borges	Lodewijk Meeuwsen	Rupert Bergmann
A Soldier; Ein Soldat	tenor	David Grünfeld	Rudolf Ruivenkamp	Johannes Strasser
Harlequin; Harlekin	tenor	David Grünfeld	Adriaan van Limpt	Johannes Strasser
Bubikopf (the Girl with Bobbed Hair), a soldier Bubikopf, ein Soldat	soprano	Marion Podolier	Roberta Alexander	Stefanie Kahl
Death; Der Tod	bass	Karel Berman	Tom Haenen	Krassimir Tassev
The Drummer; Der Trommler	mezzo-soprano	Hilde Aronson‐Lindt	Inge Frölich	Ingrid Niedermair

== Critical appreciation ==
Descriptions and summaries of Kien's libretto vary widely. John Rockwell described the opera as a story of "the abdication of death in the face of life's universal horrors." Harold Schonberg thought that "the play is stronger and more interesting than the music....In several spots the Ullmann work almost makes it as an opera." Most summaries report that Death insists that the Emperor be the first to die, but others emphasize the ending in which "miraculously, the Emperor comes to understand his crimes" and "to allow Death to save millions from the agony of life-without-death, he offers himself as Death's first victim."

In an interview, conductor James Conlon, a prominent reviver of works lost in the Holocaust, described the opera as both a political satire and a parable of hope in which the isolated Emperor represents Hitler and the Drummer his confidante Eva Braun. The young lovers and Harlequin embody "the lost world of normal human emotion."

Andrew Porter has described the text of the opera:

The plot is no cut-and-dried allegory but an elusive death-welcoming parable about a mad, murderous ruler, possibly redeemed at last, who says farewell to the world in a mock-Faustian vision of a natural paradise no longer spoiled by men; had his dream come true all men would be dead. The Emperor of Atlantis, ruler over much of the world, proclaims universal war and declares that his old ally Death will lead the campaign. Death, offended by the Emperor's presumption, breaks his sabre; henceforth men will not die. Confusion results: a Soldier and a Girl-Soldier from opposite sides sing a love duet instead of fighting; the sick and suffering find no release. Death offers to return to men on one condition–that the Emperor be the first to die. He accepts and sings his farewell.

== Synopsis ==
=== Prologue ===
The loudspeaker introduces the premise and characters to the audience.

=== Scene 1 ===
Harlequin relates his impoverished life without laughter or love. Death joins him and together they lament the slow passage of time in their grim world. He belittles Harlequin's wish to die and explains how much more dire his own situation is. He lacks respect now that "motorized chariots of war" have replaced him, the "old fashioned craftsman of dying," and work him to exhaustion with little satisfaction.

The Drummer announces the latest decree of the Emperor: Everyone will be armed and everyone will fight until there are no survivors. Death denounces the Emperor for usurping his role. (Die Seelen nehmen kann nur ich!) He declares that he is on strike and breaks his saber.

=== Scene 2 ===
The Emperor issues battle orders and monitors the progress of the universal war, from his palace. He learns of a man who continues to live eighty minutes after being hanged and shot. The Loudspeaker reports that thousands of soldiers are "wrestling with life at this very moment, doing their best to die" (Tausende ringen mit dem Leben um sterben zu können.) without success. The Emperor announces this eternal life is a gift to his subjects for their bravery, but privately worries his reign will not endure without people's fear of death. He asks "Death, where is thy sting? Where's thy victory, Hell?" (Tod, wo ist dein Stachel? Hölle, wo ist dein Sieg?)

=== Scene 3 ===
A Soldier and Bubikopf (the Bobbed-Hair Girl) confront one another as enemies. Unable to kill each other, their thoughts turn to love. They dream of distant places where kind words exist alongside meadows "filled with color and fragrance". The Drummer attempts to lure them back to battle with the sensual attraction of the call. The Maiden responds: "Now Death is dead and so we need to fight no more!" (Der Tod ist tot, zu Ende ist die Kriegesnot!) She and the Soldier sing: "Only love can unite us, unite us all together."

=== Scene 4 ===
The Emperor oversees his failing realm, as terribly injured patients complain of the agony of life without death and the state's hospitals and garrisons are overrun by insurgents under "black flags and a bloody coat of arms". Harlequin appeals to him from the shadows, reminding him of his innocent childhood, while the Drummer urges the Emperor to maintain his resolve. The Emperor realizes he has been barricaded in his palace for so long he no longer remembers what it is like to talk face to face with another man. He gazes into a covered mirror and asks: "What do men look like? Am I still a man or just the adding machine of God?" (Wie sieht ein Mensch aus? Bin ich denn noch ein Mensch oder die Rechenmaschine Gottes?)

He pulls away the mirror's cloth, revealing Death in his reflection. Death now describes himself as a gardener rather than a soldier, wishing to take lives only to spread peace and cure suffering, as one who "roots up wilting weeds, life's worn-out fellows." When the Emperor asks him to resume his duties, Death proposes a resolution to the crisis: "I am prepared to make peace, if you are prepared to make a sacrifice: will you be the first one to try out the new death?" After coming to terms with his mortality, the Emperor agrees and is taken by the hand into Death's house, allowing the suffering people to find release in death once more. The Emperor sings his farewell. In a closing chorus, Death is praised and asked to "teach us to keep your holiest law: Thou shalt not use the name of Death in vain now and forever!" (Lehr uns das heiligste Gebot: Du sollst den großen Namen Tod nicht eitel beschwören!)

== Music ==
The score comprises 20 short sections and lasts about fifty minutes. Parts of it are danced and there are long spoken sections. The 1943 orchestration is for chamber ensemble and includes such unusual instruments as banjo and harmonium. Alto saxophone and harpsichord also appear. Ullmann used the famous Lutheran chorale "Ein feste Burg ist unser Gott" as a melodic motif as well as a theme from the Asrael symphony of Josef Suk. Critics list among Ullmann's antecedents and influences "the radical young Hindemith" as well as Kurt Weill and Arnold Schoenberg. One critic has said Ullmann employed "an omnivorous musical language that draws on both classical and popular styles." The work ends with the chorale to the text "Come, Death, who art our worthy guest."

The character of Harlequin recites two poems Kien had written earlier. The first describes a cold and pitiless moon, linking him to Pierrot, a character from the commedia dell'arte known for being moonstruck and a sleepwalker. Later he sings a lullaby that uses a text Kien wrote as a paraphrase of another lullaby text, one familiar to all his contemporaries in the camp, that had been sung during the Thirty Years' War. Ullmann set it to a catchy melody composed by Johann Friedrich Reichardt in 1781.

== Recordings ==
Audio

- 1993: Michael Kraus, Franz Mazura, Martin Petzold, Herbert Lippert, Christiane Oelze, Walter Berry, Iris Vermillion; Leipzig Gewandhaus Orchestra; Lothar Zagrosek, conductor. Decca 440 854-2. This recording uses expanded orchestration and replaces the harpsichord with piano.
- 1997: Stephen Swanson, Rupert Bergmann, Johannes Strasser, Stefani Kahl, Krassimir Tassev, Ingrid Niedermayr; ARBOS – Company for Music and Theatre Gesellschaft für Musik und Theater/Ensemble Kreativ; Alexander Drčar, conductor; Herbert Gantschacher, producer. Studio Matouš 0022-2 631. This recording uses the original instrumentation.
- 2022: Adrian Eröd, Lars Woldt, Johannes Chum, Juliana Zara, Tareq Nazmi, Christel Loetzsch; Munich Radio Orchestra; Patrick Hahn, conductor. BR-Klassik 900339.

Films

- 1977: The Emperor of Atlantis. German TV film, directed by John Goldschmidt, starring Teresa Stratas and Siegmund Nimsgern, performed by the London Sinfonietta, conducted by Kerry Woodward, 57 minutes. Plus short introductory documentary on the origin of the opera based on an interview with H.G. Adler, illustrated with drawings by concentration camp inmates. WDR/BBC/Clasart.
- 2007: Viktor Ullmann – Way to the Front 1917, documentary film. Directed and written by Herbert Gantschacher; editor: Erich Heyduck. ARBOS-DVD Vienna-Salzburg-Klagenfurt-Arnoldstein.
- 2009: The Emperor of Atlantis or The Disobedience of Death, documentary music theatre about the opera by Viktor Ullmann. Directed and written by Herbert Gantschacher; sound-engineering: Roumen Dimitrov; editor: Erich Heyduck ARBOS-DVD Vienna-Salzburg-Klagenfurt.

== Graphic Novel ==
The opera was adapted into a graphic novel by Dave Maass and Patrick Lay, set to be published by Dark Horse Comics in January 2024. "Written in a concentration camp, Peter Kien and Viktor Ullmann’s opera is the truest form of artistic resistance, a middle finger to the Nazis and all authoritarians across history,” said writer Dave Maass. The book incorporates Pieter Kien's artwork, along with the architecture of Terezín and Prague. "The history of resistance against oppression and censorship is ingrained in the world”, according to its artist Patrick Lay.

== See also ==
- The Holocaust in art and literature
- List of anti-war songs
