= Johannes Chum =

Austrian operatic tenor (born 1968)

- Born: 1968 (age 57–58); Vorau, Styria, Austria
- Education: Vienna Boys' Choir; University of Music and Performing Arts Graz
- Occupation: Operatic tenor
- Website: www.johanneschum.com

Johannes Chum (born 1968) is an Austrian operatic tenor who has made an international career, first in concert, then in opera. Initially known for historically informed performance of Baroque oratorios and Mozart operatic roles, he has developed a large repertoire which also includes Wagner's Lohengrin and contemporary opera.

== Life ==
Born in Vorau, Styria, Chum began his musical education with the Vienna Boys' Choir, where he also appeared as a soloist. He first studied theology. He then studied music at the University of Music and Performing Arts Graz where he achieved a position as lecturer for historically informed performance. He appeared as a soloist in concerts during his studies, and afterwards studied voice further with Kurt Equiluz and Arthur Korn.

=== Concert ===
From 1994, Chum has appeared in concerts successfully. He has sung the tenor parts in Bach's Christmas Oratorio, St John Passion and St Matthew Passion, in Handel oratorios, Beethoven's Ninth Symphony, and work by Mendelssohn, among others, with the Gewandhausorchester in Leipzig conducted by Riccardo Chailly. At the Gewandhaus in Leipzig, he also sang Schubert's Winterreise in the orchestral version by Hans Zender.

Chum has also worked with conductors including Sylvain Cambreling, Dennis Russell Davies, Christopher Hogwood, René Jacobs, Fabio Luisi, Sir Charles Mackerras, Ingo Metzmacher, Sir Roger Norrington, Jordi Savall, Peter Schreier and Bruno Weil.

=== Opera ===
Chum made his operatic debut at the Landestheater Niederösterreich as Lysander in Britten's A Midsummer Night's Dream. He focused on Mozart roles, such as Belmonte in Die Entführung aus dem Serail, Tamino in Die Zauberflöte, Ottavio in Don Giovanni, and the title role in La clemenza di Tito.

He was recognized internationally in 1998 performing the title role of Mozart's Idomeneo at the Landestheater Salzburg. At the Burgenland Haydn-Festspiele, he appeared as Germando in L'isola disabitata in 1998 and Rinaldo in Haydn's Armida in 1999. He performed as Nerone in Monteverdi's L'incoronazione di Poppea at the Oper Frankfurt.

From 2000, the singer worked at the Komische Oper Berlin with director Harry Kupfer for many years. He performed the Mozart roles of Tamino, Titus, Ferrando and Don Ottavio, Romeo in Gounod's Roméo et Juliette, and Piquillo in Offenbach's La Périchole. At the Theater an der Wien, Chum appeared among others in 2008 as Kudrjaš in Janáček's Katja Kabanowa, in 2009 as Graf Hohenzollern in Henze's Der Prinz von Homburg, and in 2013 as Jaquino in Beethoven's Fidelio conducted by Nikolaus Harnoncourt. In 2013, he also sang two tenor roles there in a concert performance of Viktor Ullmann's chamber opera Der Kaiser von Atlantis. In Graz, he performed the title role in Offenbach's Barbe-bleue, and for the first time the title role of Wagner's Lohengrin.

== Recordings ==
Chum recorded the Evangelist in Bach's St Matthew Passion in 2009 with the Thomanerchor, the Tölzer Knabenchor and the Gewandhausorchester, conducted by Chailly. A reviewer noted: "... certainly the most essential narrative role is taken with great élan by Johannes Chum, who makes a fine Evangelist, dealing with Bach's extremes of range with capable ease." In 2015, Chum was the tenor soloist in a recording of Beethoven's Missa Solemnis, with the Arnold Schoenberg Choir and the Concentus Musicus Wien conducted by Harnoncourt. A reviewer from Gramophone described the approach as "a deeply devotional reading" and Chum's singing as "seraphic".

== Awards ==
In 2000, he was awarded the Eberhard-Waechter-Medaille. In 2001, he received the Karl-Böhm-Interpretationspreis of Styria.
