= Herbert Gantschacher =

Austrian writer (born 1956)

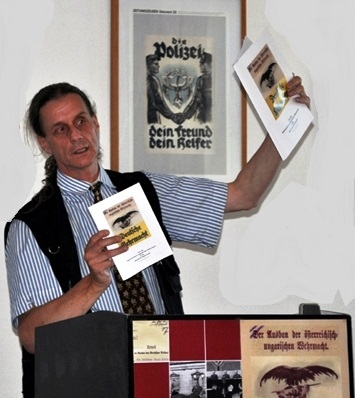
Herbert Gantschacher at the opening of Von der k.u.k. Wehrmacht in die deutsche Wehrmacht ("From the Austro-Hungarian Wehrmacht to the German Wehrmacht") (ARBOS, Vienna–Salzburg–Klagenfurt–Arnoldstein–Prora 2009/2010) in Rügen, Germany

Herbert Gantschacher (born December 2, 1956) is an Austrian director, producer, and writer.

== Education ==
Gantschacher was born in Waiern, in Feldkirchen in Kärnten, Carinthia, Austria. In 1976 he graduated from the second gymnasium in Klagenfurt. From 1977 to 1980, he studied at the Academy for Music and Performing Arts in Graz (now the University of Music and Performing Arts Graz). He graduated with honors in 1980 and received an M.A. (Master of Arts) in 1988.

== Artistic activities ==
Gantschacher has worked for the Schauspielhaus in Graz; the Salzburg State Theatre; the Tyrolean State Theatre, Innsbruck; the Danube Festival in Krems; the Chamber Opera in Vienna; the Theater an der Winkelwiese in Zürich; the festival "Musica Iudaica" in Prague; the Kulturbrauerei in Berlin; the Polish festival "Theatre without Borders" in Szczecin; the National Theatre of Kosovo in Priština; the National Arts Centre in Ottawa; Concordia University in Montreal; the United States Holocaust Memorial Museum in Washington, D.C.; the Museum of the Holocaust in Los Angeles; the festival "musica suprimata" in Sibiu (Hermannstadt) and Cluj-Napoca (Klausenburg) in Romania; the Felicja Blumental International Music Festival at the Tel Aviv Museum of Art; and the Singapore Arts Festival.

In Dresden, Gantschacher worked for the Staatsschauspiel, the kleine Szene of the Semperoper, the Dresdner Zentrum für zeitgenössische Musik, and the Festspielhaus Hellerau.

In Stockholm, he also worked for institutions such as the Kulturhuset and the Royal Swedish Opera (Kungliga Operan).

Gantschacher has also worked in Erfurt, Odesa, Saint Petersburg, Helsinki, and Bergen. In Bergen, he worked as a lecturer at the University of Bergen in the department of theatre research and at the Saint Petersburg Conservatory and at the JAMD – Jerusalem Academy of Music and Dance, where he gives masterclasses and lectures on the music of Viktor Ullmann, Hugo Wolf, Gustav Mahler, Alban Berg, Anton Webern, Arnold Rosé, and Alma Rosé.

Gantschacher is currently the artistic director of VISUAL, the European and International Visual Theatre Festival, with deaf and hearing artists and deaf-blind artists in Vienna and Austria.

He is also the artistic director of the theatre and research project "War is daDa". For that research work, he created two projects entitled "Witness and Victim of the Apocalypse" (an exhibition and book about Viktor Ullmann in World War I and the influence of his wartime experiences on his music, especially on the opera The Emperor of Atlantis, or The Disobedience of Death; ARBOS, Vienna–Salzburg–Klagenfurt–Arnoldstein–Prora 2007/2008). A Czech translation of the book was published in Prague, and a Czech version of the exhibition was presented at the City Archives of Prague in the Clam-Gallas Palace in 2015. A Russian translation of the book was published in St. Petersburg, and a Russian version of the exhibition was presented at the Russian Museum in the city of Kingisepp and at the House of Composers in St. Petersburg in 2016. A Slovenian translation of the book was published in Nova Gorica, and a Slovenian version of the exhibition was presented at the museum Grad Kromberk of the Goriški muzej in Nova Gorica in 2018 and 2019.

== Other activities ==
From 1980 to 1981, Gantschacher was a lecturer at the Academy for Music and Performing Arts in Graz (today the University for Music and Performing Arts Graz) and also gave a seminar on the Faust writings of Goethe; one of his students was the theatre and opera director Martin Kušej. In 1999, Gantschacher was a lecturer at the Institute for Theatre Research of the University of Bergen in Norway. In 1999, 2000, and 2016, Gantschacher was a lecturer at the Saint Petersburg Conservatory "Rimsky-Korsakov" in Russia. In 2018, Gantschacher was the curator of the masterclass project School of Form, together with Zvi Semel at the JAMD – Jerusalem Academy of Music and Dance, about the composer and musician Viktor Ullmann and the one-armed war-disabled pianist Paul Wittgenstein, with masterclasses for voice (Therese Lindquist), violin and chamber music (Annelie Gahl), and composition in classical and jazz style (Wolfgang Pillinger).

Gantschacher has worked on numerous conferences as a lecturer and director: in Vienna at the International Conference "The Unifying Aspects of Culture" (2003); in Villach at "On the Eve of the Apocalypse" (2004); in Nötsch at "Art and War" (2005); in Villach at "The Great War – The Forgotten War" (2005), "The Great War – The Great Dying" (2006), "The Great War – The Last Victory" (2007), and "The Great War – Long Live the Republic!" (2008); and in Nötsch and Arnoldstein at "Art.War.Music", about music and the Great War. From 2014 to 2019, he was the curator of the international project "War=daDa" in Nötsch, Arnoldstein (Austria), Prague (Czech Republic), Kingisepp, Saint Petersburg (Russia), Kobarid, Bovec, Lepena (Slovenia), Cividale, Redipuglia, Spilimbergo, and Venice (Italy).

Due to his research work, Gantschacher reconstructed the Digital Wilhelm Jerusalem Archive in 2018, eighty years after its destruction by the Nazis, as part of the memorial year Austria 1918–2018, in digital form for the department of manuscripts at the national archive of the State of Israel in the national library at the Hebrew University in Jerusalem. Also in 2018, Gantschacher built the Digital Arnold Schönberg Archive in the House, Court, and State Archive of the National Archives in Vienna; there he assembled, for the first time, all preserved original documents about the composer Arnold Schönberg and his military service in the First World War from 1914 to 1918 as a digital archive and completed the biography of the composer Schönberg.

For the Austrian Broadcasting Corporation ORF, Gantschacher has worked as a director for radio drama.

From 1994 to 1999, Gantschacher was a member of the Arts Council of the Government of Carinthia. From September 2013 to 2018, he was again a member of the Arts Council of Carinthia. From 2013 to 2014, he was also the chairman of the Council for Performing Arts of the Government of Carinthia. In 2018, he became the curator of the projects of the State of Carinthia for the memorial year "Austria 1918–2018" and the follow-up projects until 2023.

Since 2015, he has worked as a columnist for the Kleine Zeitung, one of the most important newspapers in Austria.

== Awards ==
Gantschacher has received several awards for his theatre work:

- Musictheatre Performance of the Year 1993 in the Czech Republic, for the production of the opera "The Emperor of Atlantis or The Disobedience of Death" by Viktor Ullmann
- Maecenas Prize 1994, for the project "Kar", music theatre in the mountains, in cooperation with the Verbund Company
- Maecenas Prize 2002, for the project "Theatretraps in the Underground of Vienna"
- European Label 2002, for innovative language projects
- Maecenas Prize 2003, for the project "Dada in Tramline 1 & Tramline 2"
- Nomination for the Bank Austria Art Prize 2012
- Award from UNESCO for the Visual Theatre Library, for the "development of human rights for all", 2012
- Award by the Federal Minister Gabriele Heinisch-Hosek for the theatre project "Sense of Touch – Sense of Smell – Sense of Taste", about the culture and communication techniques of the deaf-blind, with deaf-blind students and five-sensed students, in 2014
- Award by the Federal Minister Sonja Hammerschmid for the theatre project "Layers of History"
- Arteco Prize, for the project "Different Trains" (three operas on a moving train through Europe, at stations in Belgium, Germany, the Czech Republic, Slovakia, Hungary, and Austria, dealing with the theme of deportation and death during the Holocaust)
- "Cerec Award" of the Financial Times
- Honorary Trustee of the Jerusalem Academy of Music and Dance for his work on composers who perished in the Holocaust

== Works ==
=== Publications ===
==== Essays about theatre ====
- "Signer and Rossini – two brothers in spirit?" – 1992
- "Crossing Borders" – 1993
- "The new music theatre project KAR – a cooperation between industry and art" – 1994
- "Music Theatre at the concentration camp of Terezín by the example of the composer Viktor Ullmann and its significance for our time" – 1994
- "The Emperor of Atlantis – Lecture for CINARS 1994 in Montreal" – 1994
- "About the Open Form of Theatrical Art of Theatre – Lecture about the new opera house in Linz" – 1996
- "Memories and present, music and language, original and draft" – 1996
- "Music, Theatre, Dance in Austria – Lecture for CINARS 1996 in Montreal" – 1996
- "Art crossing Borders" – 1997
- "For years, the mirror is imposed! About the correspondences of cultural behavior" – 1998
- "The Art of Dialogue" – 1998
- "Memory as a mirror of ideology" – 2000
- "WorldWideWeb – Reality – Tool – Interaction" in: TRANS – Internet Magazine for Cultural Studies No. 9 – 2000
- "That there is this attempt of political change in the world definitely" – 2004
- "Victim myth Austria" – 2005
- "The Rescue of to be forgotten! – The correspondence between the Austrian-Jewish philosopher Wilhelm Jerusalem and the American deaf-blind author Helen Keller" – 2009
- "On Your Own – Laudation for the opera and theatre director Univ.-Prof. Mag. Martin Kušej, artistic director of the Austrian National Theatre Burgtheater, receiving the Prize for Culture of the State of Carinthia in the Republic of Austria", in German and Slovenian
- "The Archivist", laudation for Hubert Steiner, 2017
- "Promoting Cultural Education", essay about the new school-youth-theatre project as a contribution of the State of Carinthia to the memorial year of the Republic of Austria "Austria 1918–2018", gift 1/2018, Vienna 2018, ISSN 1992-2973
- "Peace Education, School Education, Cultural Education", essay about the school-youth-theatre project "The Peace Education of the Individual and of the Society", Klagenfurt 2019
- "Deafness and Deafblindness in the First World War", essay about Helen Keller, Wilhelm Jerusalem, Werner Mössler, Viktor Ullmann, and war-disabled deaf, blind, and deaf-blind persons (together with Gabriele Laube), Vienna 2019

==== Books ====
- "Crossing the Borders" – Das Zeichen 22/1992 – ISSN 0932-4747
- "Plurality instead of Uniformity (Klagenfurt on other tracks)" – Kärntner Druck und Verlagsgesellschaft 1996 – ISBN 3-85391-138-2
- "Tracks to Victor Ullmann", with essays written by Viktor Ullmann, Herbert Thomas Mandl, Dževad Karahasan, Ingo Schultz, and Herbert Gantschacher, published by ARBOS – Company for Music and Theatre / (Vienna: edition selene 1998), ISBN 3-85266-093-9
- "Forms of life" (a theatre book written by Herbert Gantschacher and Dževad Karahasan) – edition selene 1999 – ISBN 3-85266-041-6
- "The Mirror of History – The Past as Ideology" (3rd Prora Conference) – Stiftung Neue Kultur Berlin 2000
- Co-editor of "The Unifying Aspects of Cultures" – LIT 2004 – ISBN 3-8258-7616-0
- "I Carry the Flag or War = daDa" – Peter Lang Europäischer Verlag der Wissenschaften 2006 – ISSN 0941-1488, ISBN 3-631-55038-3
- "Witness and Victim of the Apocalypse" (book for the exhibition about the composer Viktor Ullmann in World War I and the influence of his wartime experiences on his music, especially on the opera "The Emperor of Atlantis or The Disobedience of Death") – ARBOS, Vienna–Salzburg–Klagenfurt–Arnoldstein–Prora 2007/2008
- "From the Austro-Hungarian Wehrmacht to the German Wehrmacht" – ARBOS, Vienna–Salzburg–Klagenfurt–Arnoldstein 2009
- "Forward, Don't Forget!" in "Dirty Bucket K..." edited by FreiraumK, Drava Verlag-Založba Drava Klagenfurt/Celovec 2013, ISBN 978-3-85435-710-0
- "VIKTOR ULLMANN ZEUGE UND OPFER DER APOKALYPSE – WITNESS AND VICTIM OF THE APOCALYPSE – Testimone e vittima dell'Apocalisse – Prič in žrtev apokalipse – Svědek a oběť apokalypsy" – Complete original authorized edition in German and English, with summaries in Italian, Slovenian, and Czech, ARBOS-Edition ISBN 978-3-9503173-3-6, Arnoldstein–Klagenfurt–Salzburg–Vienna–Prora–Prague, first edition 2015 and second edition 2019, with a new preface
- Viktor Ullmann – Svědek a oběť apokalypsy 1914–1944, ISBN 978-80-86852-62-1 Archiv hlavního města Prahy 2015
- Герберт Ганчахер Виктор Ульман – Свидетель и жертва апокалипсиса, ISBN 978-5-8392-0625-0 «Культ-информ-пресс» Санкт-Петербург 2016
- At the broadcasting house in the Argentinierstraße was a studio for radiodramas – in: BROADCASTING HOUSE ANTHOLOGIE, commemorative volume edited by Gerhard Ruis and Ulrike Stecher, Edition Autorensolidarität, Vienna 2017
- VERBORGENE GESCHICHTE HIDDEN HISTORY Скрытая история, ARBOS-Edition, ISBN 978-3-9503173-4-3, Arnoldstein–Klagenfurt–Salzburg–Vienna 2018
- KRIEGSGEFANGEN – KRIEGSINVALID / PRISONER OF WAR – WAR-DISABLED / военнопленные – инвалиды войны, ARBOS-Edition, ISBN 978-3-9503173-7-4, Arnoldstein–Klagenfurt–Salzburg–Vienna 2018
- Viktor Ullmann – Priča in Žrtev Apokalipse (dodatno besedilo Aneja Rože, spremno besedilo Marko Klavora, prevod Angela Žugič) Goriški muzej Kromberk, ISBN 978-961-6201-74-2, Nova Gorica 2018
- ВИКТОР УЛЬМАН СВИДЕТЕЛЬ И ЖЕРТВА АПОКАЛИПСИСА – Viktor Ullmann Zeuge und Opfer Apokalypse – Witness and Victim of the Apocalypse – Testimone e vittima dell´Apocalisse – Priča in žrtev apokalipse – Svědek a oběť apokalypsy, ARBOS-Edition, ISBN 978-3-9503173-6-7, Arnoldstein–Klagenfurt–Salzburg–Wien 2018
- "I am the Death, I have survived" – Meetings with Karel Berman, musica reanimata Berlin, mr-memorandum No. 99, December 2019
- Peacebuilding. Weapons are creating no Peace, and Weapons are not secure any Jobs | Friedensbildung. Waffen schaffen keinen Frieden, und sie sichern auch keine Arbeitsplätze | La cultura di pace. Le armi non portano la pace, e nemmeno garantiscono posti di lavoro | Mirovna vzgoja. Orožje ne prinaša miru in tudi ne zagotavlja delovnih mest, in Werner Wintersteiner, Cristina Beretta, Mira Miladinović Zalaznik (eds.): Manifest|o Alpe-Adria. Voices for A European Region of Peace and Prosperity | Manifest|o Alpe-Adria. Stimmen für eine Europa-Region des Friedens und Wohlstands | Voci per una regione europea di pace e prosperità | Glasovi za evropsko regijo miru in blagostanja. Löcker Edition, Vienna 2020 (edition pen No. 151). ISBN 978-3-99098-027-9
- Caelo in terram – Himmel auf Erden – Heaven on Earth – A sort of comedy piece and presumption of innocence with prologue, epilogue, and a main act, ARBOS-Edition, ISBN 978-3-9503173-9-8, Wien–Graz–Klagenfurt 2021
- Disobey Any Military Work! together with Strike Against the War! by Helen Keller and The War Is Over, But Peace Has Brought Us No Relief. by Wilhelm Jerusalem (both texts translated into German by Herbert Gantschacher), ARBOS-Edition, ISBN 978-3-9503173-5-0, Vienna–Salzburg–Klagenfurt 2021
- Some Notes about the Lives of Wilhelm Jerusalem and Theodor Herzl and the transcription and edition of the letters of Helen Keller and Wilhelm Jerusalem from the original facsimiles translated into German, plus the first publication of The Deafblind Author Helen Keller from the original Hebrew into English and German by Edmund Jerusalem, translated by Michael Jerusalem and Herbert Gantschacher, plus The Deafblind Author, Pacifist and Human Rights Activist Helen Keller, connected with the edition of the letters of Helen Keller and the Vice-President of US-President Franklin D. Roosevelt, Henry Wallacce, ARBOS-Edition, ISBN 978-3-9519833-0-1, Wien–Salzburg–Klagenfurt 2021
- The Emperor of Atlantis or The Disobedience of Death, anti-war opera by Viktor Ullmann (music and libretto), original text of the libretto for the first time published in the German original, including translations into English, Polish, and Czech, with essays by Herbert Gantschacher and Dževad Karahasan, edited by Herbert Gantschacher, ARBOS-Edition, ISBN 978-3-9519833-1-8, Vienna–Salzburg–Klagenfurt 2022
- Turning Points, in PERSPECTIVES on Current Affairs in Carinthia 1989–2022, edited by Peter Karpf, Werner Platzer, Wolfgang Platzer, and Thomas Pseiner for the Edition of the State of Carinthia, ISBN 3-901258-29-9, Klagenfurt 2022
- The Emperor of Atlantis or The Disobedience of Death, anti-war opera by Viktor Ullmann (music and libretto), original text published in the German original, including the translation into English by Herbert Gantschacher, with texts written by Karel Berman, Paul Kling, Herbert Thomas Mandl, Dževad Karahasan, Herbert Gantschacher, Peter Kaiser, Reinhart Rohr, and Herwig Seiser, edited by Herbert Gantschacher, ARBOS-Edition, ISBN 978-3-9519833-2-5, Vienna–Salzburg–Klagenfurt 2023

==== Translations ====
- "Disconnected – Kein Anschluß" by Willy Conley – 2000
- "On the edge of the desert" by Dževad Karahasan – 2003
- "Banquet" by Dževad Karahasan – 2005
- "The Universal Drum – Trommeln allerorts" by Willy Conley – 2011
- "Strike Against The War!" by Helen Keller – 2013–2014
- "Salem and the Stubborn Wizard", a picture story about peace from the year 2003 from Damascus by Muḥammad Dīb – 2017–2018, ISBN 9954-0-0040-2

==== Theatre plays ====
- "Agnus Dei", draft of a libretto based on a story by Francisco Tanzer, 1987, in: Austrian National Library – Austrian Literature Archive
- "The Couple" (in cooperation with Francisco Tanzer), 1987/1988, in: Austrian National Library – Austrian Literature Archive
- "Late Afternoon in Paradise", chamber opera (together with Walter Müller), music: Stefan Signer – 1992
- "The Language in Space" – 1994
- "The Singing of the Fools about Europe", together with Dževad Karahasan – 1994
- "Rehearsals on Dialogues" – 1996
- "19182338 – The number You have called is disconnected", music theatre, music: Werner Raditschnig – 1998
- "I Can See Something You Cannot See" – 2000
- "Chronicle 1933–1945", documentary theatre about the biographies of Robert Ley and Victor Klemperer (together with Katharina and Jürgen Rostock) – 2000
- "Snow and Death", dramatization of the novel "The Ring of Shahrijar" by Dževad Karahasan – 2002
- "The Death of Empedocles", dramatization of the fragments written by Friedrich Hölderlin (in cooperation with Dževad Karahasan) – 2005
- "Banquet", transmission of the librettos of Dževad Karahasan from the Bosnian language, music: Herbert Grassl, Bruno Strobl, and Hossam Mahmoud – 2005
- "A First Step" – 2008
- "Wilhelm Jerusalem – Helen Keller – Letters" – 2008, published as Visual Theatre Library Volume 1; ISBN 978-3-9503173-0-5, ARBOS-Edition © & ® 2010–2012
- "Heaven on Earth" – 2012
- "Pig Alm" – 2013
- "Talking Gloves", a visual theatre play about the painter Albin Egger-Lienz and the poet August Stramm – 2014/2018
- "The Four Seasons", a theatre play about sensual understanding of the deaf-blind – 2018
- "The Five Senses", a theatre play about the human senses from the perspective of deaf-blind persons, with music from the deaf-blind Laura Bridgman – 2019
- "M.a.r.s.h.", a theatre play for body and moved voice – 2020, world premiere at the Anschlussdenkmal Oberschützen in the State of Burgenland in Austria on May 8 and 9, 2020
- "One Desk and Three Chairs", a deaf-blind theatre play – 2021
- "The Snake and The Stork", a deaf-blind theatre play adapted from a picture story from Bethlehem in Palestine – 2022

==== Exhibitions ====
- "Witness and Victim of the Apocalypse – The Austrian Composer Viktor Ullmann in World War I as an artillery observer witnessing the poison gas attack at the Isonzo front on 24 October 1917 in Bovec (Flitsch / Plezzo), and in World War II as a victim of murder by poison gas on 18 October 1944 in Auschwitz" – Arnoldstein 2007, Prora 2008, Prague 2015, Kingisepp 2016, St. Petersburg 2016
- "From The Austro-Hungarian Wehrmacht in The German Wehrmacht" – Arnoldstein 2009, Prora 2010
- "About Images and Card Counterfeiters – The Paris Commune in the 19th century, Lenin 1917 and 1918, Austrian school atlas 2008" – Arnoldstein 2010
- "Refuse Any Military Work!" – Arnoldstein 2011
- "The Servants of All Lords" – Arnoldstein 2012
- "'... I receive a pension from the Wiener Philharmoniker subsidy whose amount shall be fixed by the General Assembly in accordance with the available resources ...' AS THE GENERAL ASSEMBLY OF THE VIENNA PHILHARMONIC DEVALUED THE PENSIONS OF THEIR JEWISH MUSICIANS BEFORE THE DEPORTATION IN THE CONCENTRATION CAMPS SHOWN WITH DOCUMENTS FOR ASSET RECOVERY AND QUESTIONS FOR RESTITUTION" – Arnoldstein 2013
- "Political Murder – the instrumentalization of politics in the 18th, 19th, 20th and 21st century" – Arnoldstein 2013
- WAR AND LIAR or THE THIRD WAR AT THE BALKANS AS A RESULT OF THE DOUBLE MURDER OF SARAJEVO or THE BREAK OF INTERNATIONAL LAW BY THE IMPERIAL AND ROYAL WEHRMACHT AND THE VIENNESE MINISTRY FOR FOREIGEN AFFAIRS IN BELGIUM IN AUGUST 1914 (Arnoldstein 2014)
- Members of the Vienna Philharmonic in The Great War and The Salzburg Festival 1918 (Arnoldstein 2014)
- WAR CRIMES and WAR RESISTERS (Arnoldstein 2015)
- WOMEN AT WAR: 'La Soldate Femme' Women-Soldiers in The Great War – Helen Keller: 'Strike Against The War!'' (Arnoldstein 2016)
- "DEAR FRIEND!": Arnold Schönberg and his piece "Gurrelieder" and the proposed performance in Switzerland by the "Kriegspressequartier" (Klagenfurt 2017)
- THE LAST BATTLE OPERATOR: Victorious Commander instead of peacebringing Emperor and King Charles (Arnoldstein 2017)
- The New Year's Concert of the Vienna Philharmonic, its cultural-political origins, its predecessors and forerunners in the context of the former combatants and war invalids in the First World War (Klagenfurt 2017/2018)
- Hidden History – Fate of War-Disabled in Austria – Deafness, Blindness and Deafblindness in The Great War 1914–1918 – Vienna
- Viktor Ullmann – Priča in Žrtev Apokalipse – Goriški muzej Kromberk, Nova Gorica 2018–2020
- "'... I receive a pension from the Wiener Philharmoniker subsidy whose amount shall be fixed by the General Assembly in accordance with the available resources ...' AS THE GENERAL ASSEMBLY OF THE VIENNA PHILHARMONIC DEVALUED THE PENSIONS OF THEIR JEWISH MUSICIANS BEFORE THE DEPORTATION IN THE CONCENTRATION CAMPS SHOWN WITH DOCUMENTS FOR ASSET RECOVERY AND QUESTIONS FOR RESTITUTION, NEW DOCUMENTS TO THE PERSONS WOBISCH, KERBER, STRASSER, MANKER AND THE CASE OF PROF. ERICH MELLER" – Klagenfurt Main Railway Station 2018–2019
- Viktor Ullmann – School of Form – Klagenfurt Main Railway Station 2019–2020
- War and War Disability – Klagenfurt Main Railway Station 2020
- Disobey Any Military Work! – About Military Work, Compulsory Social Service, Compulsory Military Service, Non-Violence, Conscientious Objectors, Deserters, Murderers and Privatization of War – Helen Keller and Wilhelm Jerusalem as a Part of Global Pacifism – Klagenfurt Main Railway Station 2020–2021
- "From the K.u.K. Wehrmacht to the German Wehrmacht – Officers of the Hapsburg Empire made careers in the NS-dictatorship" – Klagenfurt Main Railway Station 2022–2023

==== Films ====
- "Viktor Ullmann – Way to the Front 1917", documentary film; book and direction: Herbert Gantschacher; editor: Erich Heyduck; ARBOS-DVD, Vienna–Salzburg–Klagenfurt–Arnoldstein 2007
- "Spuren nach Theresienstadt – Tracks to Terezín", documentary film about the survivor of the Holocaust Herbert Thomas Mandl; interview and direction: Herbert Gantschacher; camera: Robert Schabus; editor: Erich Heyduck/DVD in German and English; ARBOS, Wien–Salzburg–Klagenfurt, 2007
- "The Emperor of Atlantis or The Disobedience of Death", documentary music theatre about the opera of Viktor Ullmann; book and direction: Herbert Gantschacher; sound engineering: Roumen Dimitrov; editor: Erich Heyduck; montage: Dieter Werderitsch; ARBOS-DVD, Vienna–Salzburg–Klagenfurt, in German 2009, in English 2010, in Italian 2010, in Czech 2015

==== Literature ====
- Christian Martin Fuchs: "The Trip into the Dream" – 1992
- Burgis Paier: "Love is no Tomato Juice!" – 1993
- Dževad Karahasan: "About the Exile in an Open Society" – 1994
- Dževad Karahasan: "Speech for the award of the Bruno Kreisky Award" – 1995
- Alfred Goubran: "Music for eyes and ears" – 1995
- Dominik Maringer: "Music in Tanzenberg" – 1996. ISBN 3-85378-459-3
- Jean-Jacques van Vlasselaer: "The Emperor of Atlantis" – 1996
- "Theatre Crossing Borders: 'The Emperor of Atlantis'. First production of the CD and Premiere at Terezín" – 1996
- Johannes Birringer: Media & performance: along the border – 1998. ISBN 0-8018-5852-6
- Michael Ausserwinkler: "Speech for the Culture Awards 1998"
- Beate Scholz: "Delicatessen!" – 1999
- Carolin Walker: "The Project Kar", in: Thomas Heinze, "Arts Funding: Sponsoring – Fundraising – Public-Private-Partnership" – 1999. ISBN 3-8258-4344-0
- Gerhard Ruiss: "Spent commitments" – 1999
- Guido Fackler: "Voice of the camp – Music in Concentration Camps" – 2000
- Hans-Günter Klein: "Live in the moment, live in eternity. The lectures of the symposium of the 100th Birthday of Viktor Ullmann" – 2000. ISBN 3-89727-099-4
- Alf Krauliz, Marion Mauthe, Lukas Beck: Rooms on the move – 10 years Donaufestival. 2002. ISBN 3-211-83864-3
- Herbert Arlt: "Trans: documentation of a cultural polylog test in the WWW" – 2002. ISBN 3-86110-324-9
- Michal Caban, Šimon Caban, Jan Dvořák: "Baletní jednotka Křeč" – 2003. ISBN 80-86102-10-6
- Elena Makarova, Sergei Makarov, Victor Kuperman: "University Over the Abyss, The story behind 520 lecturers and 2,430 lectures in KZ Theresienstadt 1942–1944" – 2004. ISBN 965-424-049-1
- Jan Vičar: "IMPRINTS Essays on Czech Music and Aesthetics" – 2005, ISBN 978-8024409894 (Department of Musicology of Palacký University Faculty of Philosophy in Olomouc), ISBN 80-903589-0-X (Togga)
- Eva Zwick: "Hearing. 'Hearing Rooms' in Deaf Theatre" – 2007
- Dario Oliveri: "Musica e cultura nel ghetto di Theresienstadt" – 2008, ISBN 9788883023583
- Jana Unuk: "The Vilenica 2010 Prize Winner Dževad Karahasan", pages 9, 13, 17 – 2010. ISBN 978-961-6547-50-5
- Rafael Ugarte Chacón: "Theatre und Deafness", pages 195–203, transcript Edition Bielefeld 2015, ISBN 978-3-8376-2962-0
- Gabriela Vojvoda: "Room and Construction of Identity in the Novels of Dževad Karahasan", pages 241–253, LIT edition Berlin 2014, ISBN 978-3-643-12737-2
- Irene Suchy & Susanne Kogler: "Scores of the Bodies" Gestures in Composition and Performance, Irene Suchy, "Signs and Art" (pp. 19–21), about performances of paintings of Albin Egger-Lienz and poems of August Stramm, Verlag Bibliothek der Provinz, Weitra 2018, ISBN 978-3-99028-633-3
- Barry Davis: "The Sounds of Theresienstadt live on", essay in the Jerusalem Post, published on 2019-12-07, page 12
- Jean-Jaques Van Vlasselaer: "Music in the Nazi Concentration Camps", pp. 569–580, in "Music in Context – Commemorative for Peter Revers", Hollitzer Edition, Vienna 2019, ISBN 978-3-99012-553-3
