= Dževad Karahasan =

Bosnian writer, essayist and philosopher (1953–2023)

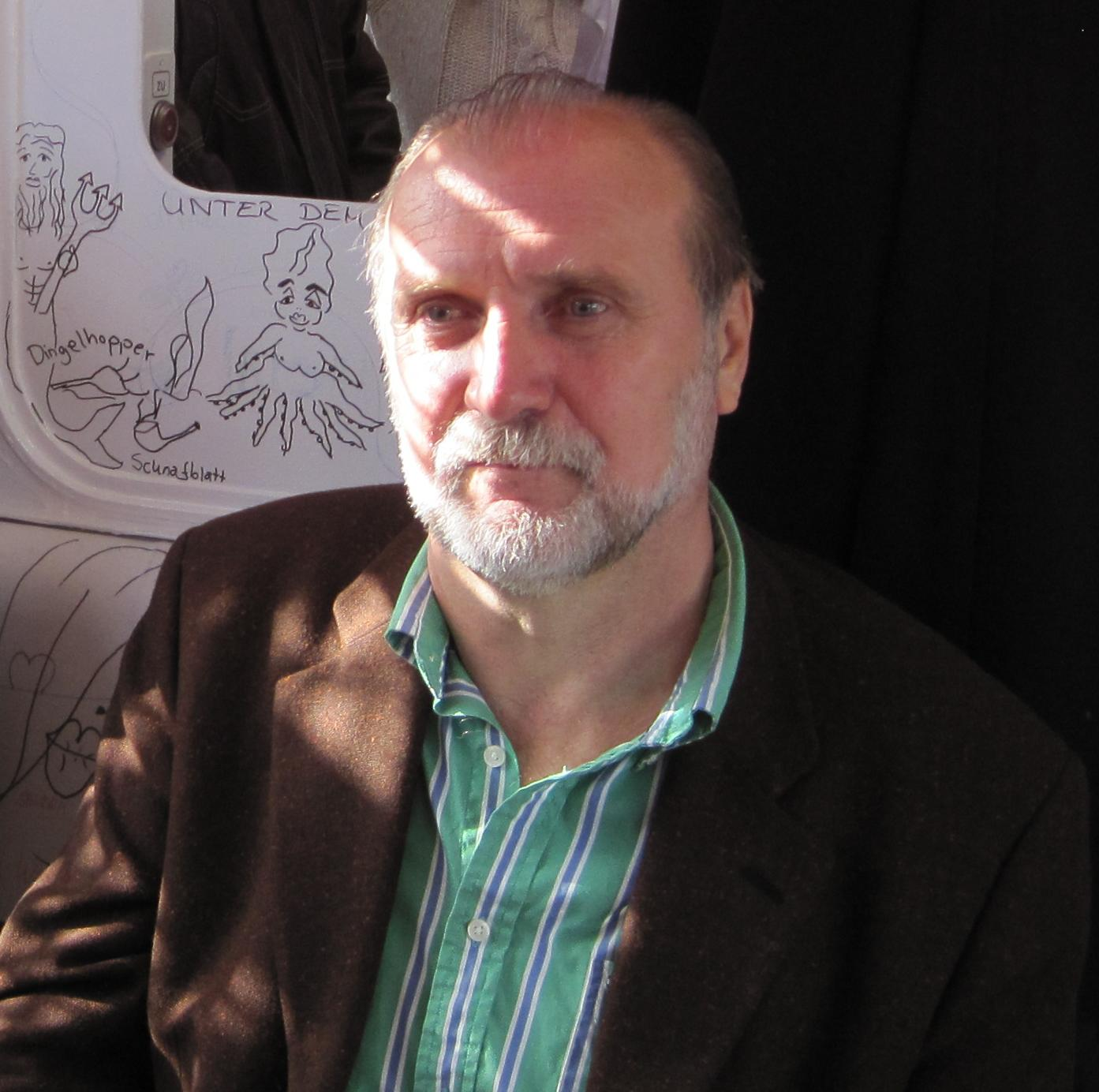
- Born: 25 January 1953; Duvno, PR Bosnia and Herzegovina, FPR Yugoslavia
- Died: 19 May 2023 (aged 70); Graz, Austria
- Citizenship: Bosnia and Herzegovina / Austria
- Education: University of Sarajevo University of Zagreb
- Occupation: Novelist
- Writing career
- Language: Bosnian, German
- Period: Postmodernism
- Genre: Novels

Dževad Karahasan (25 January 1953 – 19 May 2023) was a Bosnian writer, essayist and philosopher. Karahasan was awarded the Herder Prize and Goethe Medal for his writings.

In 2020, the city of Frankfurt awarded him the Goethe Prize.

== Early life ==
Karahasan was born in Duvno (present-day Tomislavgrad) into an ethnic Bosniak family. He described his father as a "religious communist" and mother as a devoted Muslim. He himself often spent time with Franciscan friars in the local monastery. He studied literature and theatre at the University of Sarajevo. He received his Ph.D. from the Faculty of Philosophy at the University of Zagreb.

== Career ==
From 1986 to 1993, Karahasan was a lecturer in drama and drama theory and the dean of the Academy for Performing Arts at the University of Sarajevo. In 1993, during the Siege of Sarajevo, he left the city – which plays a central role in many of his works – to become a guest lecturer at various European universities, including those in Salzburg, Berlin and Göttingen.

== Death ==
Karahasan died on 19 May 2023, at the age of 70.

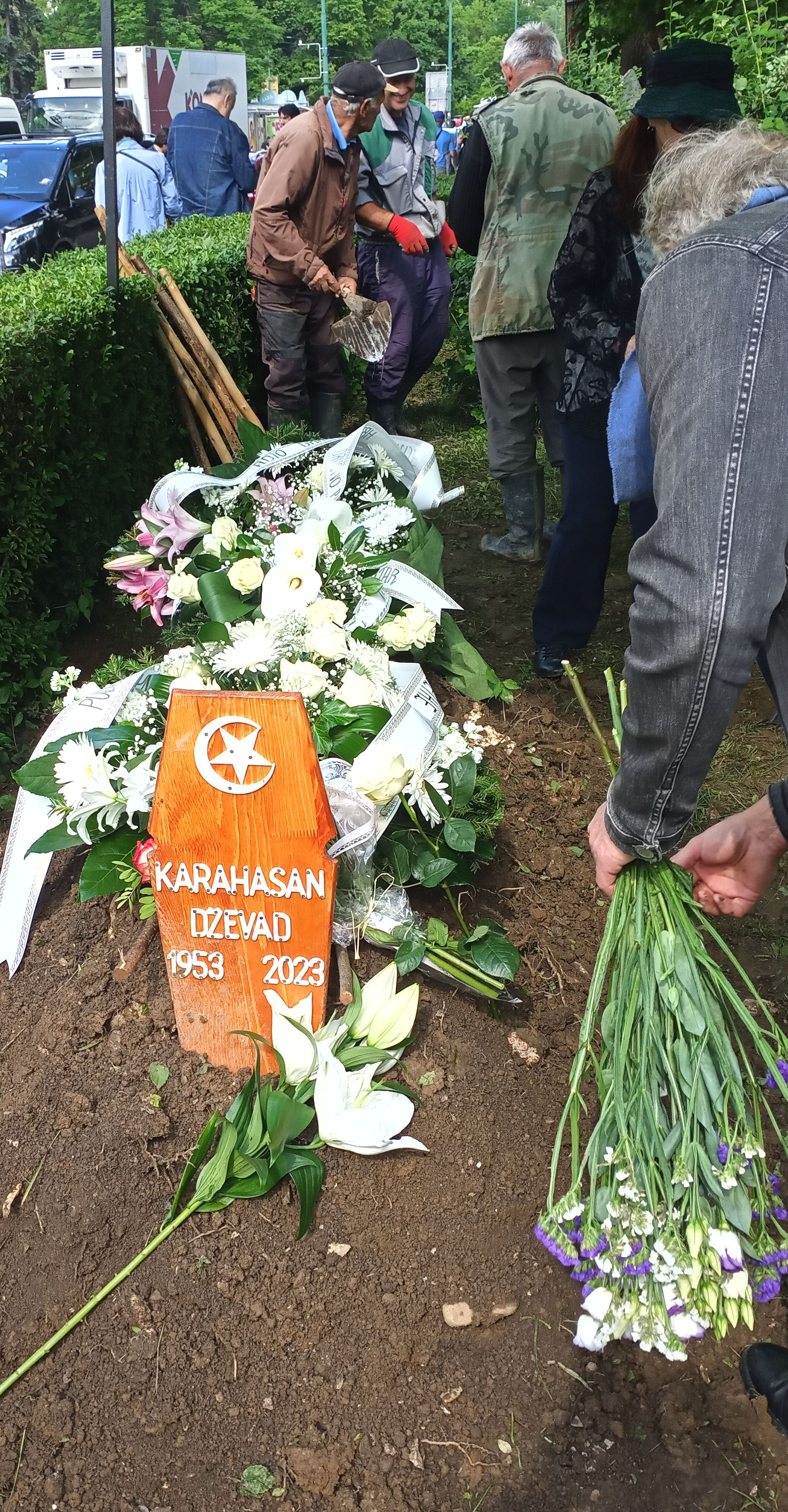
Dževad Karahasan grave

== Works ==
=== Theatre ===
Since 1993 Karahasan worked as a dramatist for ARBOS – Company for Music and Theatre. His plays have been performed in Austria (Vienna, Krems, Hallein, Eisenstadt, Salzburg, Villach, Klagenfurt), Germany (Gera, Erfurt, Berlin, Leipzig), Bosnia-Herzegovina (Sarajevo), Ukraine (Odesa), Czech Republic (Prague, Hradec Králové, Brno), Kosovo (Pristina), Poland (Szczecin), Singapore (Singapore Arts Festival) and USA (Washington DC).

=== Literature and essays ===
In addition to his dramas and novel Karahasan published numerous essays in various European newspapers.

== Prizes ==
- Charles Veillon European Essay Prize (1994)
- Bruno Kreisky Prize for Political Books (1995)
- Herder Prize (1999)
- Leipzig Book Award for European Understanding (2004)
- Vilenica Prize (2010)
- Goethe Medal (2012)
- Goethe Prize (2020)

== Publications ==
=== Novels and essays ===
- "The Eastern Divan", 1993 ISBN 3-85129-084-4
- "Sarajevo, Exodus of a City," 1993 ISBN 1-56836-057-6
- "About the exile in the open society" 1994
- "King's legends," 1996 ISBN 3-910161-73-1
- "Citizen Handke, Serbs people" in "The anxiety of the poet from reality," 1996 ISBN 3-88243-412-0
- "Should 'Faust' be saved?" in "Freedom.Equality.Fraternity." Bregenzer Festspiele 1996
- "The Shahriyar's Ring" 1997 ISBN 3-87134-239-4
- "Forms of life" (about theatre together with Herbert Gantschacher) 1999 ISBN 3-85266-041-6
- "The questions to the calendar" 1999 ISBN 3-85266-118-8
- "Sara and Serafina" 2000 ISBN 3-87134-409-5
- "The book of Gardens" 2002
- "Poetics at the Border" (together with Markus Jaroschka) 2003 ISBN 3-85489-084-2
- "The Night Council" 2006 ISBN 3-458-17291-2
- "Reports from The Dark World" 2007 ISBN 978-3-458-17337-3
- "The Shadows of The Cities" 2010 ISBN 978-3-458-17451-6
- "The Solace of the Night Sky" 2015

=== Theatre ===
- "The Wheel of St. Catherine," National Theatre Sarajevo 1990
- Abdullah Ibn al-Muqaffa" Theatre Akzent Vienna by ARBOS – Company for Music and Theatre 1994
- "The Song of Fools of Europe" Literary installation of a libretto, together with Herbert Gantschacher, Künstlerhaus Salzburg by ARBOS – Company for Music and Theatre 1994
- "Povuceni Andjeo" Danube Festival in Krems by ARBOS - Company for Music and Theatre 1995
- "The Concert of Birds" Künstlerhaus Salzburg by ARBOS – Company for Music and Theatre 1997 ISBN 3-85266-037-8
- "The Atlas of Feelings" Frankfurt/Oder 1999
- "Woyzeck" adopted from the fragment of Georg Büchner, National Theatre Sarajevo 1999
- "Babylon or The Trip of The Beautiful Jutte" European Cultural Centre Erfurt by ARBOS – Company for Music and Theatre 1999
- "The Strangers" ARBOS – Company for Music and Theatre Vienna 2001
- "UROBOS: Project Time" together with Herbert Gantschacher, Singapore Arts Festival by ARBOS – Company for Music and Theater 2001
- "Snow and death" (adopted by Herbert Gantschacher) ARBOS – Company for Music and Theatre 2002
- "On the edge of the desert" neuebuehnevillach by ARBOS – Company for Music and Theatre 2003
- "An old Oriental Fable" ARBOS – Company for Music and Theatre 2004
- "The Death of Empedocles" adopted from the fragment of Friedrich Hölderlin together with Herbert Gantschacher, ARBOS – Company for Music and Theatre 2005
- "The One and The Other" ARBOS – Company for Music and Theatre 2005
- "Banquet" neuebuehnevillach by ARBOS – Company for Music and Theatre 2005 ISSN 1012-4705
- "The Maps of The Shadows" ARBOS – Companpy for Music and Theatre 2009
- "Principle Gabriel" ARBOS – Company for Music and Theatre 2014

== Radiodrama ==
- "AL-Mukaffa" ORF Vienna 1994
- "The Delighted Angel" ORF Vienna 1995

== Audio CDs ==
- "Al-Mukaffa" ARBOS 1996
- "The Singing of The Fools of Europe" ORF ARBOS 1998
- "UROBOS : Project Time" Singapore Arts Festival 2001
- "Banquet" Tonstudio Weikert ARBOS 2006
