= Petr Kien =

Jewish artist and poet

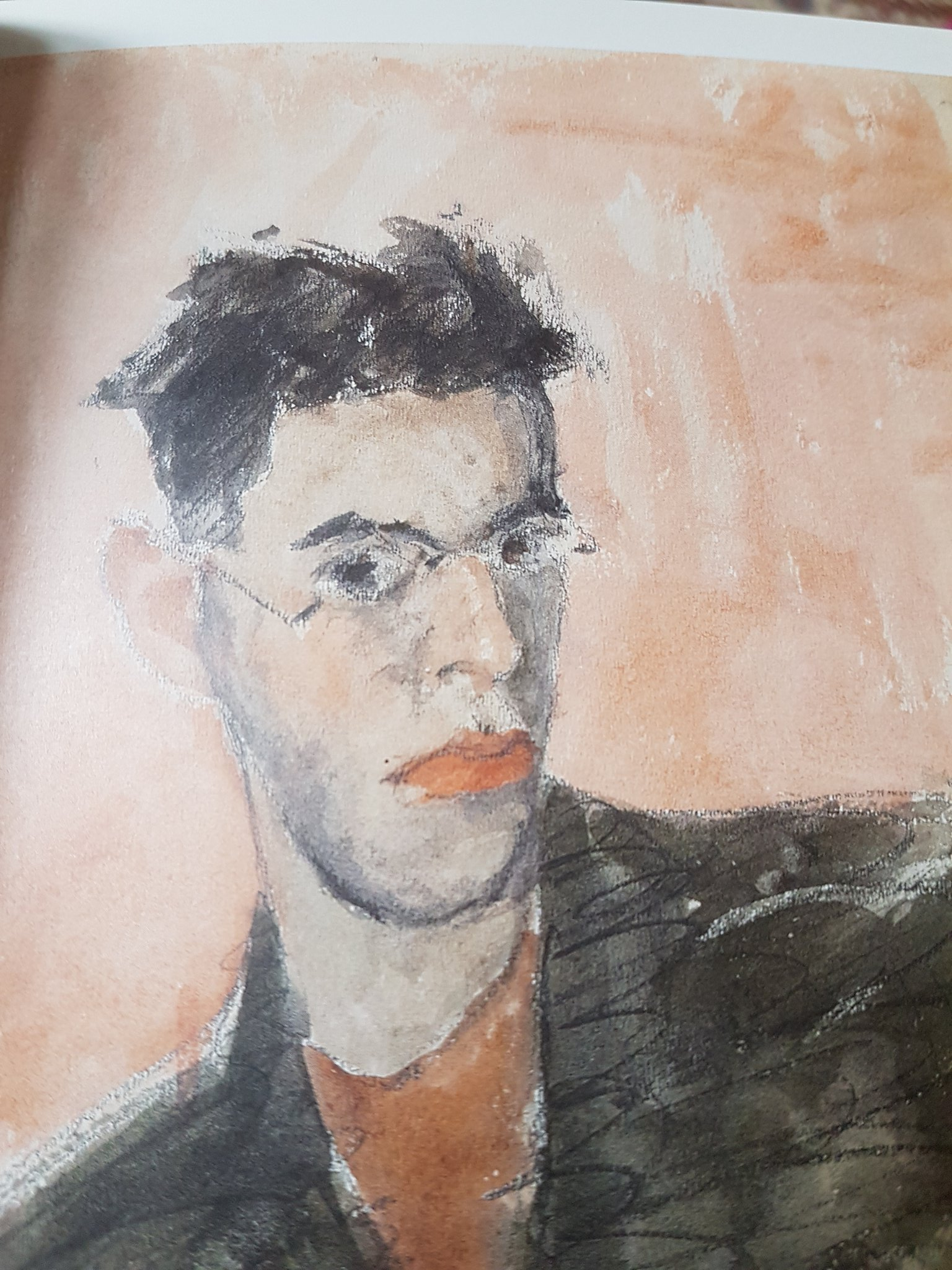
Self-portrait by Peter Kien

Peter Kien (1 January 1919 – October 1944) was a Jewish artist and poet. He died at the Theresienstadt concentration camp.

== Life and career ==
Kien was born on 1 January 1919 in Varnsdorf, Czechoslovakia, near the Czechoslovak–German border. The name of Franz Peter Kien, a prominent figure among artists imprisoned in Terezín – Theresienstadt Ghetto during World War II, is usually associated with the opera The Emperor of Atlantis by Viktor Ullmann. In addition to the libretto of that opera, Kien left significant artwork, poetry, and plays.

Kien spent his first 10 years in Varnsdorf. During the financial crisis his family moved to Brno. In 1936, Kien graduated with honors from a German high school. The certificate contains special notes on his remarkable skills in writing and drawing. The same year, Kien enrolled in Prof. Willy Novak's class at the Academy of Fine Arts in Prague and in the graphic design school Officina Pragensis under Prof. Hugo Steiner-Prag.

In 1939, after the Nuremberg Laws were enforced, Kien was expelled from the Academy, but continued to work at the Officina Pragensis under Prof. Jaroslav Švab). He started to teach art at the Vinohrady Synagogue. Married to Ilse Stránská in 1940, he tried to emigrate with his family.

In December 1941, Kien was deported to Terezín. Over a thousand drawings, sketches, designs and paintings originated from his pre-Terezín years. Consigned to the drafting room of the Technical Department in Terezín, Kien produced numerous portraits, landscapes, drawings and genre sketches. His artwork radiates light, hope and warmth. By contrast, his writings of this period are mostly tragic and hopeless.

In Terezín, Kien's social satirical play Marionettes, staged by Gustav Schorsch. was performed 25 times. Gideon Klein set Kien's poetic cycle Plague to music. His other plays written in the ghetto include Medea, Bad dream and On the Border. They found their way to the Wiener Holocaust Library in London, but were never published and never performed.

On 16 October 1944, Kien was deported to Auschwitz with his parents and his wife in the final transport in October 1944. He died from disease soon after his arrival. None of the others survived.

== Works ==
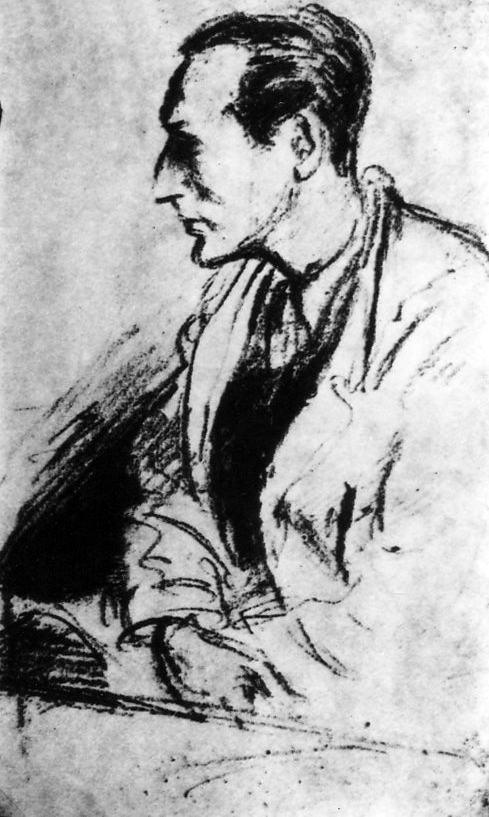
Kien's portrait of fellow inmate Bedřich Fritta

Between his arrival to Terezín in 1941 and his deportation to Auschwitz, Kien was officially the director of the Technical Drawing Office of the Jewish Self Administration. Using stolen paper, he sketched many depictions of living conditions in the Terezin ghetto. These works are among the most important works documenting that Terezin was a concentration camp rather than the model Jewish settlement the Nazis portrayed to outsiders. His works accurately reflect that its inhabitants were confined in inhuman conditions and treated severely. 681 of these works are now held in the archive of the Wiener Holocaust Library in London.

Kien also wrote the libretto to Viktor Ullmann's Der Kaiser von Atlantis, a one-act chamber opera that was composed in (originally on the back of a deportation list due to a lack of paper) and rehearsed in Terezin between 1943 and 1944 but never performed there. The original libretto is held by the Wiener Holocaust Library. It was first performed in 1975 in Amsterdam and was recorded for Decca in Leipzig in 1990. An English Touring Opera production was performed at the Royal Opera House in London and toured England in 2012. He developed many works and he loved art.
