= Deaf Theatre Network Europe Vienna =

Disability organization based in Austria

The Deaf Theatre Network Europe is an open platform of professional deaf theatres. This network was established in 2001 in Vienna during the European Deaf Theatre Conference. The mission of the platform is to bring deaf artists and deaf theatre to a bigger audience.

The following projects are part of the mission statement:

- 1. Permanent videodocumentary of the work by deaf professionals. This work is done by the "Teatr 3§ from Szczecin(Poland) under the artistic direction of Olgier Koczorowski.
- 2. Deaf Theatre for children presented in cooperation with the deaf theatre of the Janaček Academy for Performing Arts in Brno VDN-DIFA-JAMU(Czech Republic), "Teatr 3" Szczecin, Quest:arts for everyone(USA) and ARBOS- Company for Music and Theatre(Austria).
- 3. Professional education and courseware for training of deaf actors coordinated by ARBOS - Company for Music and Thestre.
- 4. The history of Deaf Theatre in Europe.
- 5. Cooperation of "Teatr 3", ARBOS and Ramesh Meyyappan(Singapore/Scotland) during the elaboration of theatre projects.
- 6. Organisation of the "European Deaf Theatre Conference" and informal meetings of the theatre during the year coordinated by ARBOS.
- 7. Performances during the "European & International Deaf Theatre Festival" in Vienna plus network conference.

Deaf Theatre is a part of the world of the arts and is done by deaf artists. But a cooperation of deaf and hearing artists on an equal level is possible. Deaf Theatre tells stories of deaf people, their lives and their culture. The theatre may include sign language, drama, mime, visual theatre, dance, music, comedy and all other forms of performing arts.

"Deaf Theatre" is performed for deaf and hearing audience.

== See also ==
- de:Deaf Theatre Network Europe Vienna (German language)
