= Daniel Mandl =

Czech anthroposophist

Daniel Mandl (April 20, 1891 – March 23, 1945) was a civil engineer, inventor, and a student of anthroposophy.

== Life ==
Daniel Mandl was born in Prostějov, Moravia. He studied engineering at the University of Vienna, Austria. During World War I, he commanded an artillery unit of the Austro-Hungarian Army, and fought in Albania. A decorated officer, he resumed his studies after World War I. Upon graduation, he was employed by the General Electrical Company in Berlin. He was involved in the electrification of Slovakia, and he introduced the then-new technology of arc welding to Czechoslovakia, making improvements to arc welding electrodes. He was a student of anthroposophy.

After the annexation of rump Czechoslovakia by Nazi Germany on March 15, 1939, Mandl held a teaching position in the Technical School founded by the Brno Jewish community. He was deported from Brno to the Terezin (Theresienstadt ghetto on March 31, 1942, together with his wife Hajnalka and his son Tommy (Herbert Thomas Mandl). In Terezin, Mandl worked in the Jewish self-administration. He participated in the Jewish cultural life in the ghetto, delivering at least one lecture, titled "A Chapter from Some Thoughts On the History of Humanity," on June 23, 1944.

Mandl and his son were deported from Theresienstadt concentration camp to Auschwitz-Birkenau on September 28, 1944. Unbeknownst to his son Tommy at the time, Tommy was the only one selected for the transport but his father volunteered to go with him. From Auschwitz, the Mandls were transported, in turn, to several Dachau-Kaufering subcamps, where Mandl died March 23, 1945, a mere six weeks before the end of World War II (cf. testimonies of his son, Herbert Thomas Mandl).
