= Viktor Ullmann =

Austrian Jewish composer (1898–1944)

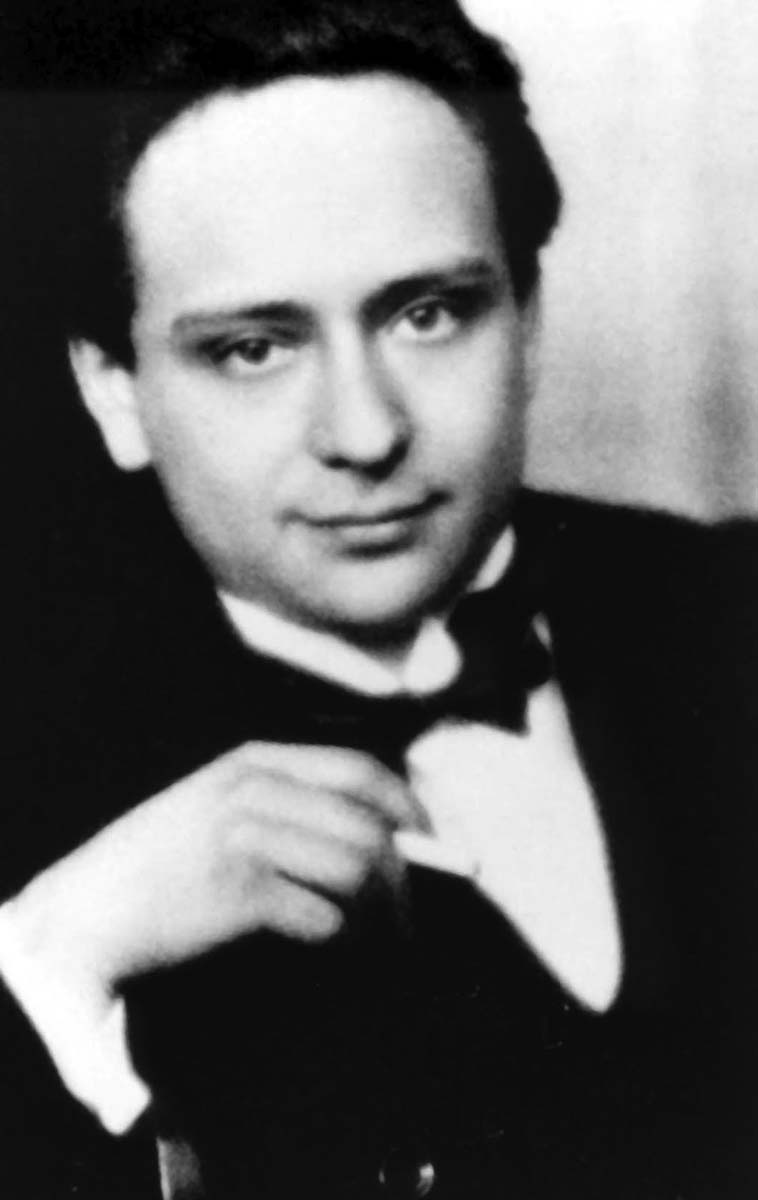
- Born: 1 January 1898; Cieszyn, Austria-Hungary
- Died: 18 October 1944 (aged 46); Auschwitz-Birkenau, German-occupied Poland
- Occupation: Composer

Viktor Ullmann (1 January 1898 – 18 October 1944) was a Silesia-born Austrian composer, conductor and pianist.

== Biography ==
Viktor Ullmann was born on 1 January 1898 in Cieszyn (Teschen), which belonged then to Austrian Silesia in the Austro-Hungarian Empire. Both his parents were from families of Jewish descent, but had converted to Catholicism before Viktor's birth. As an assimilated Jew, his father, Maximilian, was able to pursue a career as a professional officer in the army of the Austro-Hungarian Empire. In World War I he was promoted to colonel and ennobled.

One writer has described Ullmann's milieu in these terms: "Like such other assimilated German-speaking Czech Jews as Kafka and Mahler, Ullmann lived a life of multiple estrangements, cut off from Czech nationalism, German anti-Semitism and Jewish orthodoxy".

Beginning in 1909 Viktor attended a grammar school (Gymnasium) in Vienna. His musical talents and inclinations soon gave him access to Arnold Schoenberg and his circle of pupils. Upon finishing school, he volunteered for military service.

After deployment on the Italian Front at Isonzo, he was granted study leave, which he used to start studying law at Vienna University. There he also attended the lectures of Wilhelm Jerusalem. At the beginning of 1918 he was accepted in Schoenberg's composition seminar. With Schoenberg he studied the theory of form, counterpoint and orchestration. Ullmann was an excellent pianist, although he had no ambitions for a career as a soloist.

In May 1919, he broke off both courses of study and left Vienna in order to devote himself fully to music in Prague. His mentor was now Alexander von Zemlinsky, under whose direction he served as a conductor at the New German Theatre of Prague (now the Prague State Opera) until 1927. In the following season, 1927–28, he was appointed head of the opera company in Aussig an der Elbe (Ústí nad Labem), but his repertoire, including operas by Richard Strauss, Krenek and others, was too advanced for local tastes, and his appointment was terminated.

In 1923 with the Sieben Lieder mit Klavier (7 Songs with Piano) he witnessed a series of successful performances of his works, which lasted until the beginning of the 1930s (Sieben Serenaden). At the Geneva music festival of the International Society for New Music in 1929, his Schönberg Variations, a piano cycle on a theme by his teacher in Vienna, caused something of a stir. Five years later, for the orchestral arrangement of this work, he was awarded the Hertzka Prize, named in honor of the former director of Universal Edition. In the meantime he had been appointed conductor in Zürich for two years. As a result of his interest in anthroposophy, a movement founded by Rudolf Steiner, he spent another two years as a bookseller in Stuttgart, but was forced to flee Germany in mid-1933 and returned to Prague as a music teacher and journalist.

During this period he worked with the department of music at Czechoslovak Radio, wrote book and music reviews for various magazines, wrote as a critic for the Bohemia newspaper, lectured to educational groups, gave private lessons, and was actively involved in the program of the Czechoslovak Society for Music Education. At about this time Ullmann made friends with the composer Alois Hába, whom he had known for some time. Ullmann enrolled in Hába's department of quarter tone music at the Prague Conservatory, where he studied from 1935 to 1937.

While his works of the 1920s still clearly show the influence of Schönberg's atonal period, especially the Chamber Symphony Op. 9, the George Songs Op. 15 and Pierrot Lunaire, Op. 21, Ullmann's compositions from 1935 onwards, like the String Quartet No. 2 and Piano Sonata No. 1, are distinguished by a musical development that is more independent of Schönberg's inspiration. Similarly the opera Fall of the Antichrist develops the issues raised by Alban Berg's opera Wozzeck. Dissonant harmonics, highly charged musical expression, and masterly control of formal structure are characteristic of Ullmann's new and henceforth unmistakable personal style.

== Theresienstadt concentration camp ==
On 8 September 1942 he was deported to the Theresienstadt concentration camp. Up to his deportation his list of works had reached 41 opus numbers and contained an additional three piano sonatas, song cycles on texts by various poets, operas, and the piano concerto Op. 25, which he finished in December 1939, nine months after the entry of German troops into Prague. Most of these works are missing. The manuscripts presumably disappeared during the occupation. Thirteen printed items, which Ullmann published privately and entrusted to a friend for safekeeping, have survived.

The particular nature of the camp at Theresienstadt enabled Ullmann to remain active musically: he was a piano accompanist, organized concerts ("Collegium musicum", "Studio for New Music"), wrote critiques of musical events, and composed, as part of a cultural circle including Karel Ančerl, Rafael Schachter, Gideon Klein, Hans Krása, and other prominent musicians imprisoned there. He wrote: "By no means did we sit weeping on the banks of the waters of Babylon. Our endeavor with respect to arts was commensurate with our will to live."

Overall, Ullmann "probably made the most significant contribution of any single individual to the musical life of Terezin", composing 20 works in the camp.

On 16 October 1944 he was deported to the camp at Auschwitz-Birkenau, where he was killed in the gas chambers two days later.

== Later works ==
The work he completed in Theresienstadt was mostly preserved and comprises, in addition to choral works, song cycles and a quantity of stage music, such significant works as the last three piano sonatas, the Third String Quartet, the melodrama based on Rilke's Cornet poem, and the chamber opera The Emperor of Atlantis, or The Disobedience of Death, with a libretto by Peter Kien. Its premiere was planned for Theresienstadt in the autumn of 1944, conducted by Rafael Schachter, but it is believed that the SS commander noticed similarities between the Emperor of Atlantis and Adolf Hitler and suppressed it. However, eye-witness Herbert Thomas Mandl argues, "that the Emperor is not Hitler".

The opera was first performed in Amsterdam in 1975 in a version of the conductor Kerry Woodward. It has been broadcast by BBC television in Britain, and there have been productions in several countries. Important productions took place in Bremen and Stuttgart in 1990; American premieres took place in San Francisco in 1975 and in Brooklyn in 1977. Other works include the song-cycle "Man and his Day" to poems by Ullmann's friend, the poet and later historian of Theresienstadt, H. G. Adler.

Since 1993 it is possible to perform the original version of the opera with the help of Karel Berman, based on his Terezin rolebook and the musicologist Ingo Schultz. This reconstructed original version of the original score has been used for the production of the opera done by the director Herbert Gantschacher for ARBOS - Company for Music and Theatre. This production used also Ullmann's original title "The Emperor of Atlantis or The Disobedience of Death" and has been recorded by the Prague label STUDIO MATOUS in 1994/1995. This production of the opera by Herbert Gantschacher has been performed for the first time at Terezin on 23 May 1995. From these first performances at Terezin ever a live recording exists done by ARBOS – Company for Music and Theatre. In all, Ullmann worked on the opera for 27 years, from the first impressions in the First World War in 1917 to the finalization at Terezin in 1944.

The most concrete formulation of this discourse occurs in the Emperor of Atlantis, with the parable of the Emperor's game with Death for Life. The "game", which concerns the Emperor's plan for the total destruction of all human life, ends with the ruin of the Emperor and with the vision of a new understanding between life and death.

When Ullmann was deported to Auschwitz, he left his works in the safekeeping of the philosopher Emil Utitz. After the war, Utitz gave them to H. G. Adler in Theresienstadt in 1945, and Adler brought the scores to England in 1947. Adler subsequently placed them on long-term loan with the Anthroposophical Society (AAG) in Dornach, Switzerland. In an apparent breach of contract the AAG subsequently deposited them with the Paul-Sacher-Stiftung, Basel, where they are currently being held illegally, prior to the preparation of a legally valid loan agreement.

== Chronology ==
- 1898 Born in Teschen (in Austrian Silesia) on 1 January
- 1909–16 Attended school in Vienna
- 1916–18 Military service as a volunteer; service at the Front; promotion to Lieutenant
- 1918 Attended the University of Vienna, studying law and attending lectures in sociology and philosophy of Wilhelm Jerusalem and attending Arnold Schoenberg's "composition seminar"
- 1920 autumn: Choirmaster and co-repetiteur under Alexander von Zemlinsky in the New German Theatre in Prague; later (1922–27) conductor
- 1925 Composition of the "Schönberg Variations" for piano (first performance 1926 in Prague)
- 1927–1928 Director of Opera in Aussig an der Elbe (Ústí nad Labem); afterwards back in Prague without a position
- 1929 Success of the "Schönberg Variations" at the music festival of the International Society for New Music (Internationale Gesellschaft für Neue Musik; IGNM) in Geneva
- 1929–1931 Composer and conductor for stage music in the theatre at Zürich
- 1931–1933 Bookdealer in Stuttgart, as proprietor of the anthroposophical Novalis-Bücherstube
- 1933 Flight from Stuttgart; return to Prague
- 1934 Hertzka Prize for the orchestral arrangement of the "Schönberg Variations" (Op. 3b)
- 1935–1937 Instruction in composition from Alois Hába
- 1936 Hertzka Prize for the opera The Fall of the Antichrist (Op. 9)
- 1938 After the performance of the Second String Quartet at the IGMN Festival in London, stays for about two months in Dornach near Basel
- 1939 Beginning of the persecution of the Jews in the Protectorate of Bohemia and Moravia
- 1942 (8 September) Deportation to Theresienstadt Concentration Camp; active as composer, conductor, pianist, organiser, teacher and music critic. Most important compositions preserved in manuscript: 3 piano sonatas; piano sonatas; songs; opera The Emperor of Atlantis; melodrama The Manner of Love and Death of Cornet Christoph Rilke
- 1944 (16 October) Transfer to Auschwitz-Birkenau, where he was murdered in the gas chambers on 18 October 1944

== List of the Prague and Theresienstadt works ==
In the middle of 1942, shortly before his deportation to Theresienstadt concentration camp, Ullmann drew up a comprehensive list of his compositions to that point. This list was preserved in a London library as part of a letter to a correspondent whom it has not hitherto been possible to identify. In contrast to earlier lists of works, the London list is distinguished by an unbroken sequence of opus numbers (1–41) and the unmistakable incorporation of works or titles already known. Ullmann's list of works is of incalculable value in light of the lost or missing compositions, although it makes clear the full extent of the loss caused by persecution and war.

In the following summary Ullmann's opus numbering has been used, and extended for the opus numbers given to works composed in Theresienstadt. The order of titles is essentially chronological and takes account both of compositions known from earlier lists of works as well as of those bibliographically recorded. Uncertain dating is indicated by (?). Traces of an earlier numeration derive from the list of works from the 1920s (Riemann Musiklexikon 11/1929). These references occur only in connection with the "Schönberg Variations", which in relation to the opus numeration and to the chronology cut across the principle of arrangement used.

=== Prague works ===
Work	Year	Previous Numeration	Notes
Three Choruses for Male Voices a cappella	1919	Opus 1	
Songs with Orchestra	1921	Opus 2	
Abendlied (Evening Song) (Claudius) for Choir, Soloists and Orchestra	1922	Opus 3	
Music for a Play from a Christmas Tale "Wie Klein Else das Christkindlein suchen ging" (How Little Else Went to Look for the Christ Child)	1922		First performance Prague 1922
Seven Putty Songs with Piano	1923	Opus 4	First performance Prague 1923, IGNM music festival Prague 1924
Opus 1 – 1st String Quartet	1923	Opus 5	First performance Prague 1927
Seven Songs with Chamber Orchestra	1924	Opus 6	First performance Prague 1924
Symphonic Fantasy (also known as "Solo Cantata for Tenor and Orchestra"	1924	Opus 7	First performance Prague 1925
Incidental music for Der Kreidekreis (The Chalk Circle) (Klabund)	1924		First performance Prague 1925
(21) Variations and Double Fugue on a Small Piano Piece by Schönberg (Op. 19, 4)	1925	Opus 9	First performance Prague 1926
Opus 2 – Octet (also known as "Oktettino")	1924	Opus 8	First performance Prague 1926
Trio for Woodwind	1926	Opus 10	
Opus 4 – Concerto for Orchestra (also known as "First Symphony" and "Symphonietta")	1928	Opus 11	First performance Prague 1929
(5) Variations and Double Fugue on a Small Piece by Schönberg (for Piano)	1929		Variations and Double Fugue on a Small Piano Piece by Schönberg 1929. A transcript by a Prague copyist was preserved. IGNM music festival, Geneva 1929.
Opus 5 – Seven Small Serenades for Voice and 12 Instruments (text also by Ullmann)	1929		First performance Frankfurt am Main 1931.
Opus 6 – Peer Gynt (Ibsen). Opera	1927–29		Completed after 1938.
Opus 3 a – (9) Variations and Double Fugue on a Theme by Schönberg for Piano	1933/34		Self-published Prague 1939.
Opus 3 b – Variations, Fantasy and Double Fugue on a Small Piano Piece by Schönberg, for Orchestra	1933/34		Hertzka Prize 1934. First performance Prague 1938. A set of orchestral parts was preserved in transcripts by two Prague copyists.
Opus 7 – 2nd String Quartet	1935		First performance Prague 1936. IGNM music festival London 1938.
Opus 8 – (Seven) Elegies for Soprano and Orchestra	1935		First performance Prague 1936 (3 pieces). Opus 8, 2 was preserved as a holograph: "Schwer ist's das Schöne zu lassen" (It Is Difficult to Leave the Beautiful) (Steffen).
Opus 9 – Der Sturz des Antichrist (The Fall of the Antichrist), play for a stage dedication in 3 Acts (Steffen)	1935		Hertzka Prize 1936. The score and a part-written piano arrangement, both holographs, were preserved.
Opus 10 – 1st Piano Sonata	1936		Self-published Prague 1936. UA Prag 1936. IGNM music festival New York 1941.
Opus 11 – Chinese Melodramas (also known as "Galgenlieder" or Gallows Songs)	1936		First performance Prague 1936 (4 pieces).
Opus 12 – Huttens letzte Tage (Hutten's Last Days) (C. F. Meyer), lyrical symphony for tenor, baritone und orchestra	1936/37 (?)		
Opus 13 – Missa Symphonica for choir, soloists, orchestra and organ ("in honour of the Archangel Michael")	1936		
Opus 14 – Three Choruses a cappella (also known as "Rosenkreuzer Cantata")	1936		
Opus 15 – Easter Cantata (also known as "Chamber Cantata") for small mixed choir and 6 instruments	1936		
Opus 16 – Sonata for Quarter-tone Clarinet and Quarter-tone Piano	1936		First performance Prague 1937. Only the clarinet part is preserved, as a holograph.
Opus 17 – Six Songs (Steffen) for soprano and piano	1937		Self-published Prague 1937. First performance Prague 1937.
Opus 18 – Songs (Kraus, Goethe, Novalis) (also known as "Song Cycle II")	1937 (?)		
Opus 19 – 2nd Piano Sonata	1938/39		Self-published Prague 1939. First performance Prague 1940.
Opus 3 c – Variations and Double Fugue on a Theme by Arnold Schoenberg	1939		Preserved as a photocopy of the holograph.
Opus 20 – Spiritual Songs for High Voice and Piano	1939/40		Self-published Prague 1940. First performance Prague 1940.
Opus 21 – Songs (Brezina)	1929/39 (?)		
Opus 22 – Children's Songs	1939/40 (?)		
Opus 23 – Der Gott und die Bajadere (The God and the Bayadere) (Goethe) for baritone and piano	1940 (?)		First performance Prague 1940.
Opus 24 – Slavic Rhapsody for orchestra and obligato saxophone	1939/40		Self-published Prague 1940 (printed as "Opus 23").
Opus 25 – Piano Concerto	1939		Preserved as a holograph; self-published Prague 1940.
Opus 26 – Five Love Songs (Huch) for soprano and piano	1939		Self-published Prague 1939.
Opus 27 – Lieder des Prinzen Vogelfrei (Songs of Prince Vogelfrei) (Nietzsche)	1940		
Opus 28 – 3rd Piano Sonata	1940		Self-published Prague 1940 (printed as "Opus 26")
Opus 29 – Three Sonnets from the Portuguese (Elizabeth Barrett Browning, transl. Rilke) for soprano and piano	1940		Self-published Prague 1940. First performance Prague 1940.
Opus 30 – Songbook of Hafiz for bass and piano	1940		Self-published Prague 1940. First performance Prague 1940. Based on Hans Bethge's "Nachdichtungen der Lieder und Gesänge des Hafis", vol 2 (first published 1910 by Insel-Verlag, Leipzig; new edition by YinYang-Media Verlag October 2004 ISBN 3-935727-03-8).
Opus 31 – Nachlese (Gleanings). Songs	1940 (?)		
Opus 32 – Krieg (War). Cantata for Baritone	1940 (?)		
Opus 33 – Die Heimkehr des Odysseus (The Homecoming of Odysseus). Opera	1940/41 (?)		
Opus 34 – Six Sonnets (Labé) for soprano and piano	1941		Self-published Prague 1941.
Opus 35 – Six Songs for Alto or Baritone and Piano	1941 (?)		
Opus 36 – Der zerbrochene Krug (The Broken Jug) (Kleist). Opera	1941/42		Self-published 1942.
Opus 37 – Three Songs (C. F. Meyer) for baritone and piano	1942		Preserved as holograph ("renewed in Theresienstadt"). First performance Theresienstadt 1943.
Opus 38 – 4th Piano Sonata	1941		Self-published Prague 1941.
Opus 39 – Sonata for Violin and Piano	1937 (?)		Only a transcription of the violin part is preserved. First performance planned Prague 1938.
Opus 40 – Concert Aria (from Goethe's Iphigenie)	1942 (?)		
Opus 41 – Six Songs (H. G. Adler)	1942 (?)		

=== Theresienstadt works ===
Work	Year	Notes
Three Songs for Baritone (C. F. Meyer)	1942	cf. Opus 37. Not later than 4 November 1942.
3rd String Quartet	1943	Preserved as a copy of the holograph. Counted as Opus 46. Not later than 23 January 1943.
Autumn (Trakl) for soprano and string trio	1943	Preserved as a holograph. Not later than 24 January 1943.
(2) Songs of Consolation (Steffen) for deep voice and string trio	1943	Preserved as a holograph.
Ten Yiddish and Hebrew Choruses Zehn (women's, men's and mixed choir)	1943	Preserved as transcripts by Theresienstadt copyists.
Incidental music for a play by François Villon	1943	First performance Theresienstadt 20 July 1943.
Wendla in the Garden (Wedekind) for voice and piano	1943	Preserved as a holograph. Not later than 1 July 1943.
5th Piano Sonata	1943	Preserved as a holograph. Counted as Opus 45. Not later than 27 June 1943.
(2) Hölderlin Songs for voice and piano	1943/44	Preserved as a holograph.
Immer inmitten (Always in the midst) (H. G. Adler). Cantata for mezzo-soprano and piano	1943	Two songs preserved as holographs. First performance Theresienstadt 30 October 1943.
6th Piano Sonata	1943	Preserved as holograph. Counted as Opus 49 (cf "Kaiser von Atlantis"). Not later than 1 August 1943. First performance Theresienstadt before 30 October 1943.
Der Mensch und sein Tag (Man and his Day) (H. G. Adler). 12 Songs for Voice and Piano	1943	Preserved as a holograph. Counted as Opus 47. Not later than 4 September 1943.
"Chansons des enfants francaises" [sic] for voice and piano	1943	One song ("Little Cakewalk") preserved as a holograph. Date of dedication: 27 September 1943.
Three Chinese Songs for Voice and Piano	1943	Two songs preserved as holographs. Not later than October 1943.
Der Kaiser von Atlantis oder die Tod-Verweigerung (The Emperor of Atlantis, or The Refusal of Death). Play in one act (Kien)	1943/44	Preserved as a holograph. Counted as Opus 49 (cf 6th piano). Composition begun June/July 1943; finished 13 January 1944. Revision ("Wahnsinns-Terzett" / Madness tercet) August 1944.
Don Quixote. Overture for piano (draft score)	1943	Preserved as a holograph. Not later than 21 March 1944.
30 May 1431. Libretto for a "Joan of Arc" opera in 2 Acts	1944	Preserved as a holograph. Date of preface 16 May 1943.
Three Yiddish Songs for Voice and Piano	1944	Preserved as a holograph. Counted as Opus 53. First Song dated 25 May 1944.
Die Weise der Liebe und des Todes. (The Manner of Love and Death) (Rilke). 12 pieces for spoken voice and orchestra or piano (draft score)	1944	Preserved as a holograph. First performance before 28 September 1944. Not later than 12 July 1944.
7th Piano Sonata	1944	Preserved as a holograph. Dated on title page 22 August 1944.
Abendphantasie (Evening Fantasy) (Hölderlin) for voice and piano	1944	Preserved as a holograph.
Cadenzas to Beethoven's Piano Concertos (Nos 1 und 3)	1944	Preserved as a holograph. Counted as Opus 54.
Three Hebrew Boys' Choruses (a cappella)	1944	Preserved as a transcript by a Theresienstadt copyist.

== Sources ==
- Schultz, Ingo, Viktor Ullmann. Leben und Werk Kassel, 2008. ISBN 978-3-476-02232-5
- Initiative Hans Krása in Hamburg: Komponisten in Theresienstadt, ISBN 3-00-005164-3
- Karas, Joza, Music in Terezin 1941–1945 NY: [Beaufort Books Publishers, undated
- Ludvova, Jitka, "Viktor Ullmann," in Hudebni veda 1979, No. 2, 99–122
- Schultz, Ingo: "Viktor Ullmann," in Flensburger Hefte, Sonderheft Nr. 8, Summer 1991, 5–25
- ARBOS – Company for Music and Theatre, Tracks to Viktor Ullmann, including material written by Herbert Thomas Mandl, who worked with Ullmann as a violinist in Terezín, Ingo Schultz, Jean-Jacques Van Vlasselaer, Dzevad Karahasan, and Herbert Gantschacher, edition selene, Vienna, 1998
- Herbert Thomas Mandl, Tracks to Terezín, interview with Herbert Thomas Mandl about Terezín and Viktor Ullmann, DVD, ARBOS Vienna-Salzburg-Klagenfurt, 2007
- Erich Heyduck and Herbert Gantschacher, Viktor Ullmann – Way to the Front 1917, DVD, ARBOS, VIENNA-Salzburg-Klagenfurt, 2007
- Herbert Gantschacher Viktor Ullmann – Zeuge und Opfer der Apokalypse / Witness and Victim of the Apocalypse / Testimone e vittima dell'Apocalisse / Svědek a oběť apokalypsy / Prič in žrtev apokalipse. ARBOS-Edition, Arnoldstein- Klagenfurt – Salzburg – Vienna – Prora – Prague 2015, ISBN 978-3-9503173-3-6
- Герберт Ганчахер Виктор Ульман – Свидетель и жертва апокалипсиса «Культ-информ-пресс» Санкт-Петербург 2016, ISBN 978-5-8392-0625-0
- The Emperor of Atlantis or The Disobedience of Death Anti-war opera by Viktor Ullmann (Music and libretto), original text of the libretto for the first time published in the German original including translations into English, Polish and Czech language with essays by Herbert Gantschacher and Dževad Karahasan, edited by Herbert Gantschacher, ARBOS-Edition, ISBN 978-3-9519833-1-8, Vienna-Salzburg-Klagenfurt 2022.

== Recordings ==
- "Schwer ist´s, das Schöne zu lassen" – complete songs for soprano and piano by Viktor Ullmann (Irena Troupová – soprano, Jan Dušek – piano). Prague: ArcoDiva, 2015.
