= Herbert Thomas Mandl =

Jewish-Czech musician, philosopher, inventor, author (1926-2007)

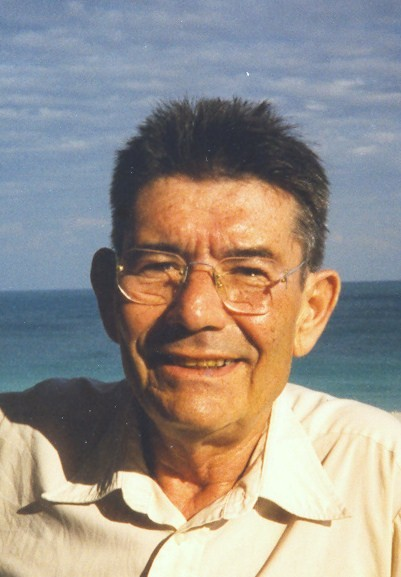
- Mandl in 1990
- Born: August 18, 1926; Bratislava, Czechoslovakia
- Died: February 22, 2007 (aged 80); Meerbusch-Büderich, Germany
- Occupations: Jewish-Czech musician, philosopher, inventor, author, contemporary witness to the Holocaust

Herbert Thomas Mandl (August 18, 1926 - February 22, 2007) was a Czechoslovak-German-Jewish author, concert violinist, professor of music, philosopher, inventor and lecturer. He authored novels, stories and dramas that are inspired by the extraordinary events of his life.

== Life ==
Mandl was born in Bratislava, Czechoslovakia, the son of Czech Jewish parents, the engineer Daniel Mandl and Hajnalka Mandl. He was educated in Jewish and Czech schools in Bratislava and in Brno. He began to play the violin at the age of 6.

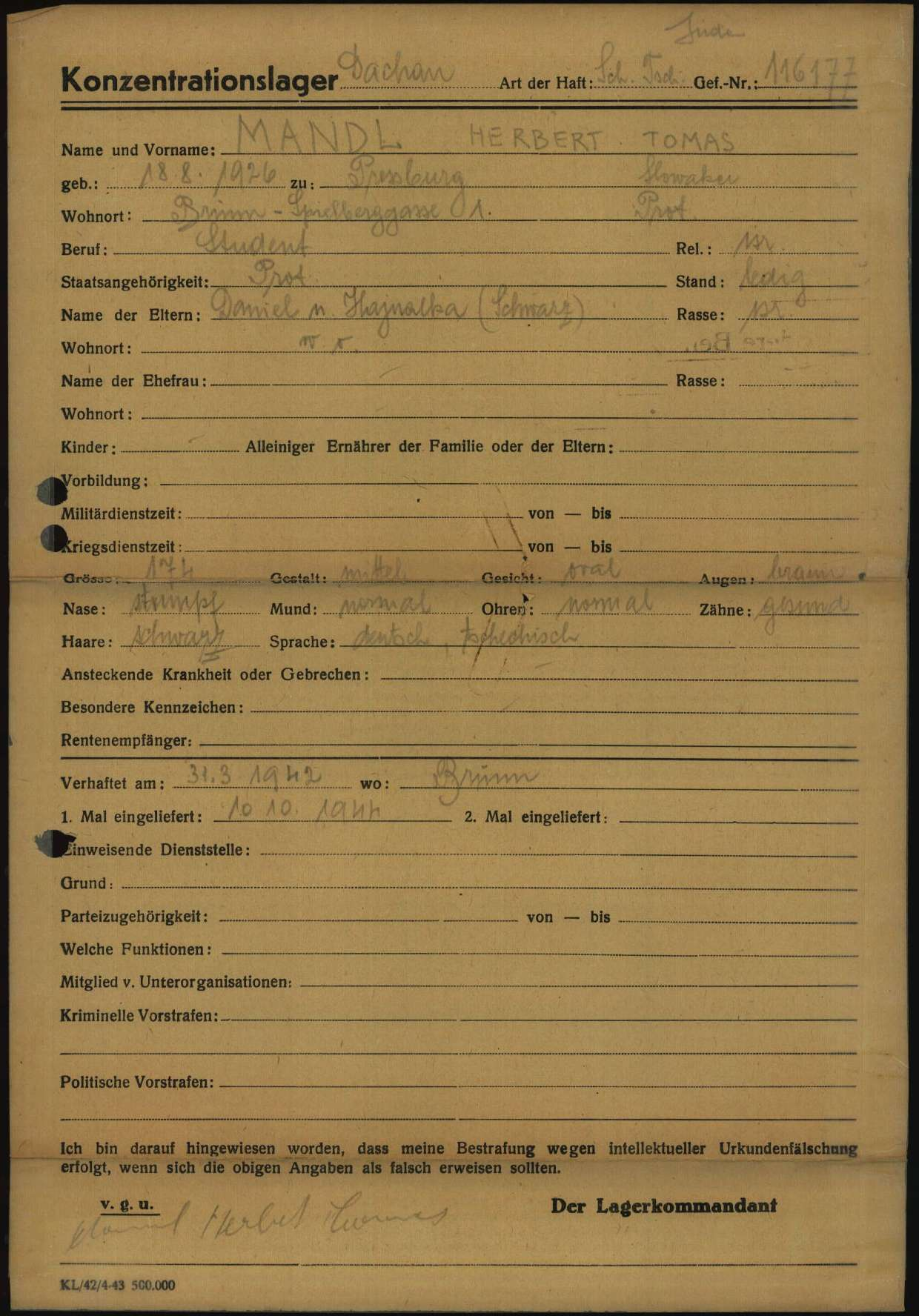
Registration form of Herbert Thomas Mandl as a prisoner at Dachau Nazi Concentration Camp

The Mandls were living in Brno when the remains of Czechoslovakia were annexed by Nazi Germany on March 15, 1939. Mandl was 13 at the time. In 1942, Mandl and his parents were deported to the Terezín (Theresienstadt) ghetto. In 1944, Mandl and his father were transported to the Auschwitz concentration camp, thence to several Dachau-Kaufering satellite camps, where Mandl's father died. At the end of World War II, Mandl was repatriated to Czechoslovakia where he was reunited with his mother.

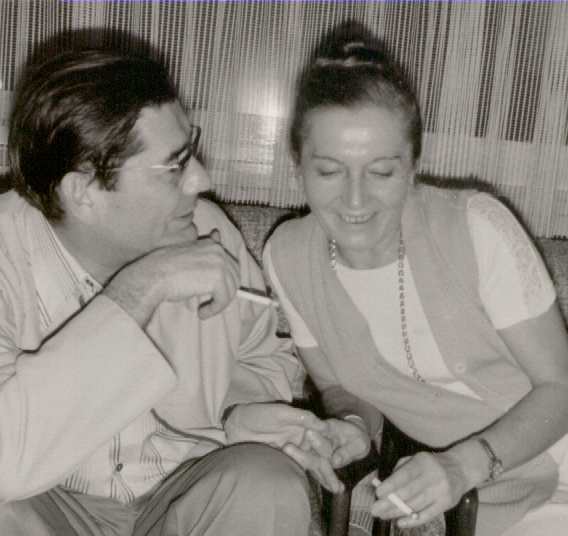
Slavi and Tommy Mandl in 1978

Once free, Mandl returned to his studies. He was ultimately awarded a doctorate in the performing arts (violin) from the Academy of Performing Arts in Prague in Prague, where he met his future wife, Jaroslava (“Slavi”), a concert pianist. While professors of music at the Janáček Conservatory in Ostrava, the Mandls developed several plans for escaping to the West from the oppressive conditions in Communist Czechoslovakia. Mandl himself finally succeeded in Cairo, where he broke away from his tourist group and applied for asylum at the United States Embassy in Cairo. Initially, he was suspected of being a spy, and the CIA interrogated him for months. When released, he was placed in a refugee camp in Zirndorf, West Germany. (“There were as many spies as real refugees there,” he had said of Zirndorf.) Once granted the status of political refugee, Mandl moved to Cologne, where he became the private secretary of Heinrich Böll, the recipient of the 1972 Nobel Prize for Literature. Since Mandl’s wife Slavi had remained behind in Ostrava (this was by the Mandls' prior agreement), Böll had agreed to help smuggle her to the West. He engaged a professional illusionist to build a hideaway in his personal automobile, a Citroen DS-19, drove to Czechoslovakia with his entire family and smuggled Slavi out. This incident is documented in Mandl's autobiography, Durst, Musik, Geheime Dienste published in Germany in 1995 and in a Bavarian television film directed by Gloria de Siano.

In later years, Mandl produced and edited cultural broadcasts that were transmitted to Communist Eastern Europe by the West German radio station Deutsche Welle in Cologne. He and Slavi twice emigrated to the US, where he studied psychology at the University of Washington in Seattle, Washington and was supervisor on the ward for the criminally insane at Western State Hospital in Tacoma, Washington. In 1971, the Mandls permanently returned to West Germany, settling in Meerbusch-Büderich. Mandl found a position as a professor of English at the Roman Catholic evening gymnasium (Nikolaus-Groß-Abendgymnasium) in Essen, where he remained until his retirement.

In addition to his other talents, Mandl was an inventor. He developed and patented two very different devices. One was a transparent model of a human head (the phonetic head) that contained movable speech organs and was used to help teach pronunciation of foreign languages. The second was the Suggestometer, a complex device that could be used to measure human suggestibility empirically – something that was considered impossible by research psychologists at the time. Mandl was also a very successful psychotherapist who continued to provide mental health treatment even after his retirement. During the last decades of his life, Mandl was a very active as a contemporary witness regarding the orchestra in the Terezin (Theresienstadt) ghetto; he had played the violin in the camp orchestra in 1943/44 under the batons of Karel Ančerl and Carlo Sigmund Taube.

As one of the few survivors of the Terezín ghetto, he provided eyewitness accounts for this surreal occurrence.

== Literary Themes ==
The central theme of Mandl’s literary work is the battle of the individual against the sophisticated instruments of totalitarian oppression: secret services, isolation, psychological torture, brainwashing, incarceration, starvation, the debilitating effects of the "daily grind" in the most difficult of circumstances. As in works by Edgar Allan Poe, Aldous Huxley, Franz Kafka and George Orwell, Mandl's protagonists, armed only with their reason, stand alone against all the sophisticated torture arts of their seemingly omnipotent opponents. In his works, Mandl underscores the drama of this unequal combat by interspersing the narrative with philosophical reflections written in clear and meaningful language. His novel, The Philosopher’s Wager (published in Germany in 1996 as Die Wette des Philosophen, is remarkable for its vivid portrayal of not just the most mundane aspects of life in the Terezín (Theresienstadt) ghetto but also of the extensive, if illegal, cultural and musical life of the ghetto. (For more on this subject, see also University Over the Abyss by Elena Makarova, Sergei Makarov and Viktor Kuperman).

== Works ==
Prose

- Der Held und sein Geheimnis (The Hero and His Secret), short stories, Bernardus, 1991.
- Durst, Musik, Geheime Dienste (Thirst, Music, Secret Services), autobiography, Boer, 1995.
- Die Wette des Philosophen (The Philosopher's Wager), autobiographical/historical novel, Boer, 1996.
- Auf der Insel der Phantome (On the Island of Phantoms), novel, Dittrich, 2003.
- Liebe und Verderb bei Phantomen (Love and Ruin among Phantoms), novel, Wishbohn Verlag Mülheim a.d.Ruhr, 2005.

Essays

- The Oracle, in "Kontinent 14", Ullstein Verlag, Frankfurt-Berlin-Wien 1980, ISBN 3-548-38010-7
- Remembering Viktor Ullmann, in "Tracks to Viktor Ullmann" including essays written by Dževad Karahasan, Jean-Jacques Van Vlasselaer, Ingo Schultz and Herbert Gantschacher, edited by ARBOS – Company for Music and Theatre, Selene-Edition Vienna 1998
- Productive Defiance- Culture and the Holocaust, lecture given at the United States Holocaust Memorial Museum as a prologue to the performance of the opera of Viktor Ullmann "The Emperor of Atlantis" performed by ARBOS - Company for Music and Theatre, Washington D.C., November 1998
- Theresienstadt / Terezín - Significance - History - Psychology, Schwerin 2002
- A Memory of Elias Canetti, published by ACCUS-Theatre, St.Pölten 2003
- Mass murder and Culture - Johann Sebastian Bach resistance fighter, Berlin 2005

Audio-CD

- Die Reise ins Zentrum der Wirklichkeit (The Trip to the Center of Reality), published by ARBOS - Company for Music and Theatre, TW 972172, Tonstudio Weikert, Glanhofen 1997

Film

- Spuren nach Theresienstadt/Tracks to Terezín. Interview and director: Herbert Gantschacher; camera: Robert Schabus; graphics: Erich Heyduck / DVD in German and English; ARBOS, Wien-Salzburg-Klagenfurt, 2007.
- Unbekannter Böll/Der Nobelpreisträger als mutiger Fluchthelfer (The Unknown Böll/The Nobel Laureate’s Courageous Collaboration in an Escape). Film by Gloria de Siano. 3sat Kulturjournal 14. January 2004

Theater

- Die Reise ins Zentrum der Wirklichkeit (Voyage to the Center of Reality), performed in Hallein and Klagenfurt, Austria; premiere sponsored by ARBOS – Company for Music and Theatre, 1997.
- Der dreifache Traum von der Maschine (The Threefold Dream of the Machine), performed in Prora/Rügen, Germany, and Salzburg, Villach and Arnoldstein, Austria; premiere sponsored by ARBOS-Gesellschaft für Musik und Theater, 2004.
- Der vertagte Heldentod (A Hero's Death Postponed), performed in Prora/Rügen, Germany and Villach and Arnoldstein, Austria; premiere sponsored by ARBOS-Gesellschaft für Musik und Theater, 2005.
- Das Ziel der Verschollenen (The Destination of the Vanishing), performed in Arnoldstein, Austria; premiere sponsored by ARBOS – Company for Music and Theatre, 2006.

Mandl's other works for the stage include:

- Das Gehirnklavier oder Das zweite Experiment (The Brain Instrument or The Second Experiment)
- Der Gast aus der Transzendenz (The Guest from Transcendence), also in novel format
- Die übersinnliche Verschwörung (The Transcendental Conspiracy)
- Verhöre mit ungewissem Ergebnis (Interrogations with Doubtful Outcomes)

Opera

- Šarlatán / Der Scharlatan (The Charlatan) Opera composed by Pavel Haas, German version of the libretto by Herbert Thomas Mandl and Jaroslava Mandl (Czech National Library 1993)

In addition to being published in Germany, several of Mandl's works have been translated into Czech and published in the Czech Republic between 1994 and 2000. Other unpublished stories, dramas and presentations with philosophical and political themes are contained in Mandl’s bequest to the archives of the Moses Mendelssohn Academy in Halberstadt, Germany.

Most of Mandl's works have been translated into English by Michael J. Kubat of Virginia Beach, Virginia, United States.

== Quotes ==
As long as you still have breath left in your body, you should continue to speak out loudly as a contemporary witness to the National Socialist era.

— Herbert Thomas Mandl on the occasion of the premiere of his play The Voyage to the Center of Reality (in German only, as Die Reise ins Zentrum der Wirklichkeit, 1997)
