= Brundibár =

Opera by Hans Krása

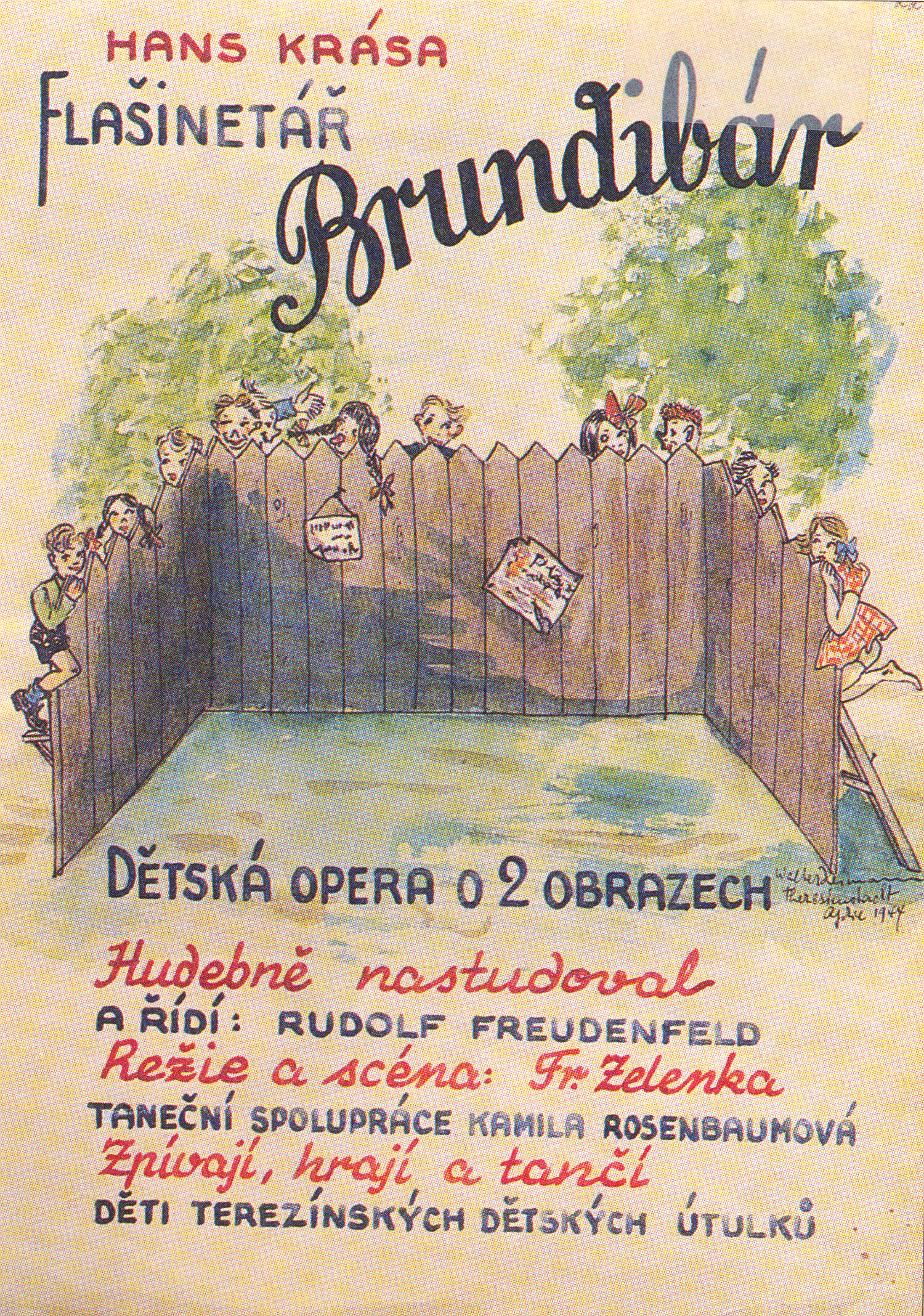
Poster for a performance of Brundibár, Theresienstadt, 1944.

Brundibár is a children's opera by Jewish Czech composer Hans Krása with a libretto by Adolf Hoffmeister, made most famous by performances by the children of Theresienstadt concentration camp (Terezín) in occupied Czechoslovakia. The name comes from a Czech colloquialism for a bumblebee.

== History ==
Krása and Hoffmeister wrote the opera in 1938 for a government competition, but the competition was later cancelled due to political developments. Rehearsals started in 1941 at the Jewish orphanage in Prague, which served a temporary educational facility for children separated from their parents by the war. In the winter of 1942 the opera was first performed at the orphanage for a limited audience of 150 people: by this time, composer Krása and set designer František Zelenka had already been transported to Theresienstadt. By July 1943, nearly all of the children of the original chorus and the orphanage staff had also been transported to Theresienstadt. Only the librettist Hoffmeister was able to escape Prague in time.

Reunited with the cast in Theresienstadt, Krása reconstructed the full score of the opera, based on memory and the partial piano score that remained in his hands, adapting it to suit the musical instruments available in the camp: flute, clarinet, guitar, accordion, piano, percussion, four violins, a cello and a double bass. A set was once again designed by František Zelenka, formerly a stage manager at the Czech National Theatre: several flats were painted as a background, in the foreground was a fence with drawings of the cat, dog and sparrow and holes for the singers to insert their heads in place of the animals' heads. On 23 September 1943, Brundibár premiered in Theresienstadt. The production was directed by Zelenka and choreographed by Camilla Rosenbaum, and was shown 55 times in the following year.

A special performance of Brundibár was staged in 1944 for representatives of the Red Cross who came to inspect living conditions in the camp; much of what they saw during their visit was a show, and that one of the reasons the Theresienstadt camp seemed acceptable was that many of the residents had been deported to Auschwitz in order to reduce crowding during the visit.

Later that year this Brundibár production was filmed for a Nazi propaganda film Theresienstadt: ein Dokumentarfilm aus dem jüdischen Siedlungsgebiet (Theresienstadt: a documentary film from the Jewish settlement area). In the following months many of those filmed were sent to Auschwitz. Amongst those who were murdered there were the children, the composer Krása, the director Kurt Gerron, and the musicians.

The Brundibár footage from the film is included in the Emmy Award-winning documentary Voices of the Children directed by Zuzana Justman, a Terezin survivor, who sang in the chorus. Ela Weissberger, who played the part of the cat, appears in the film. The footage appears again in As Seen Through These Eyes, a 2009 documentary directed by Hilary Helstein. There Weissberger describes the opera in some detail, noting that the only time that the children were permitted to remove their yellow stars was during a performance.

== Storyline ==
Unsere Gans ist ausgeflogen
Excerpt from Berliner Kinderoper production, 2005

The plot of the opera shares elements with fairytales such as Hansel and Gretel and The Town Musicians of Bremen. Aninka [in English Annette] and Pepíček (Little Joe) are a fatherless sister and brother. Their mother is ill, and the doctor tells them she needs milk to recover. But they have no money. They decide to sing in the marketplace to raise the needed money. But the evil organ grinder Brundibár (of this figure Iván Fischer has said, "Everyone knew he represented Hitler") chases them away. However, with the help of a fearless sparrow, keen cat, and wise dog, and the children of the town, they are able to chase Brundibár away, and sing in the market square.

== Symbolism ==
The opera contains obvious symbolism in the triumph of the helpless and needy children over the tyrannical organ grinder, but has no overt references to the conditions under which it was written and performed. However, certain phrases were to the audience clearly anti-Nazi. Though Hoffmeister wrote the libretto before Hitler's invasion, at least one line was changed by poet Emil Saudek at Terezin, to emphasize the anti-Nazi message. "While the original said,'He who loves so much his mother and father and his native land is our friend and he can play with us,' Saudek's version reads: 'He who loves justice and will abide by it, and who is not afraid, is our friend and can play with us.'"(Karas, p. 103).

== Reconstruction in War and Remembrance ==
In the American miniseries War and Remembrance, in episode 10, an excerpt from the opera Brundibar can be seen being staged on the day of the visit by Red Cross representatives. The set design has been reconstructed (painted houses, fences, ice cream cart). As the inspectors look into the theatre, the children act out the ending of the 6th scene from the Act 1.

== Mecklenburgh Opera Production UK 1992 ==
Mecklenburgh Opera Production: UK 1992. Mecklenburgh Opera brought Brundibar to the UK in 1992. The company's Artistic director John Abulafia created an English performing version. This was staged at London's Queen Elizabeth Hall in a double bill with another Terezin opera, The Emperor of Atlantis by Viktor Ullmann. John Abulafia directed, Anne Manson conducted, the cast was drawn from the New London Children's Choir. This production was filmed by the BBC, the TV director was Simon Broughton: it was shown on VE Day 1995.

Mecklenburgh Opera then revived the production at Stirling Arts Centre in 1995, the Janáček Festival at Hukvaldy in 1996. John Abulafia revived the production in 2002 with the Halle Orchestra. The cast was drawn from schools in Salford and the Halle conducted by Edward Gardner. It was staged as part of the opening celebrations of the Imperial War Museum North.

== The Kushner version ==
In 2003, the opera was adapted into a children's picture book by Tony Kushner with illustrations by Maurice Sendak. Sendak emphasized the symbolism of the opera by drawing the character of Brundibár with a Hitler moustache. The book was named one of the New York Times Book Review's 10 Best Illustrated Books of 2003. The book was named a Sydney Taylor Book Award Notable book for Older Readers in 2003.

The opera was performed in 2003 at Chicago Opera Theater; directed and designed by Sendak, with Tony Kushner's libretto.

In 2005, the book was turned into a full production of the opera, with libretto by Tony Kushner adapted from Hoffmeister's. Sendak and Kris Stone designed the sets and Robin I. Shane designed the costumes for the new production. The opera premiered at the Berkeley Repertory Theatre where it was performed along with another short Czech opera, Comedy on the Bridge, with music by Bohuslav Martinů and libretto by Tony Kushner adapted from Václav Kliment Klicpera. The opera then moved to the New Victory Theater for its Off-Broadway New York premiere, and Comedy on the Bridge was replaced with a new Kushner play, But the Giraffe. But the Giraffe was about a young girl who was faced with the difficult decision of taking her beloved stuffed giraffe or her uncle's Brundibár score. It served as a curtain raiser for Brundibár. In 2005 and 2011, the children's opera was performed at the Victory Theatre in Evansville, Indiana.

In 2006, Brundibár and Comedy on the Bridge were staged by the Yale Repertory Theater in New Haven, CT.

== Performance history ==
The opera has enjoyed increasing popularity in recent years, and has been performed in different versions in England, Czech Republic, Israel, Australia and across the United States. In 1995 in Germany and in Austria the opera was performed as a part of a school and memory project in cooperation with survivors from Terezín, such as Herbert Thomas Mandl or Eva Hermannová. The American premiere of Brundibar (in Czech) took place in West Hartford, CT on April 8, 1975; the world premiere of the English version, in the translation of Milada Javora and Joža Karas, was held in Ottawa, Canada on November 14, 1977. The first fully staged production by an opera company to include Holocaust survivor Ela Stein-Weissberger, who had performed in the original production at the Terezín camp happened in 1998 at Sarasota Opera, Florida.

Cherub Company London presented a fully professional UK production at the Riverside Studios, London, in 2001. The production was unusual inasmuch as the children's characters were played by adult actors (Samuel Dutton and Kathryn Fray). The remaining characters, including Brundibár himself (William Wollen), were played by actors on stilts, creating a nightmarish world for the children. The production was directed by Andrew Visnevski and was presented in a double bill with Kafka's The Trial under the title Degenerate! A double-fare to commemorate the victims of the Holocaust.

In 2006, students from the University of Texas at San Antonio performed Brundibár in Terezin itself, becoming the first American production to return the show to the site where it was originally performed.

=== Other performances ===
The Australian premiere of the opera was staged in 2000 in Canberra, in conjunction with the exhibition "Behind the Walls: The Theresienstadt Ghetto 1941-1945". It was also staged by the Windmill Theatre Company in Adelaide in 2003, in what was described as "a highly politicised" production. Both these productions were conducted by Richard Gill.

In October 2000, Cincinnati Opera presented Brundibár at the Aronoff Center, with John Morris Russell conducting and stage direction by Brian Robertson. In attendance was Ela Stein-Weissberger, who sang the role of the Cat in Theresienstadt and was one of the few children who survived. During the final moments of the production, Ms. Weissberger emerged from the wings to sing the Victory Song alongside the cast. The opera's prologue also featured local survivors who appeared on stage while young actors told their stories.

In December 2003 and 2004 respectively, Santa Monica College's Madison Project in conjunction with Los Angeles Opera run children's camp performed Brundibár at Miles Memorial Playhouse, the Museum of Tolerance, and the Santa Monica College 11th street campus, where The Broad Stage has since been built. Survivors of Terezin were in attendance and spoke at all performances about their experiences.

In November 2004, Brundibar was performed by OzOpera, the touring arm of Opera Australia, as part of the Gandel Festival of Jewish Music. The first Melbourne performance was attended by Peter Gaspar, who had performed in the original Terezin performances as a child of 7. He survived the war and migrated with his family to Australia.

In May 2014, Nieuw Vocaal Amsterdam performed Brundibár as part of the yearly Dutch commemoration of World War II. The performance was attended by Ela Weissberger. A documentary was shot in Theresienstadt by Dutch national television, in which Caro Kindt, director of Nieuw Vocaal Amsterdam, spoke with one of the Theresienstadt survivors.

In August 2014, Brundibár was staged in Sydney (Australia) by Opera Prometheus and Joseph Toltz in association with the Sydney Jewish Museum. The production featured a reproduction of artwork by the child survivor Kitty Passerová Levy, with consultation from Theresienstadt survivors living in Australia, including Jaroslav (Jerry) Rind, who helped with the original construction of the set in Theresienstadt, as well as Edith Druckerová Sheldon and Joe Neustatl, both of whom had seen the production in the ghetto.

In November 2015, Brundibár returned to Sarasota Opera for a new production but this time Youth Opera Music Director Jessé Martins and Stage Director Martha Collins created a companion piece to the work entitled "Raise Up Your Voice: Intolerance Through the Voices of Children". They write: "When we first began our research into Brundibár, we were profoundly moved by the history surrounding the work – that of it having been performed by children in the Terezin camp-ghetto. As we delved more into the lives and writings of these young artists, most of whom did not survive the Nazi regime, we became deeply inspired and humbled to learn they strove to stay creative artistically under such prohibitive conditions. It quickly became imperative to us that the companion piece we would create to go with Brundibár not use words and stories created by us, but rather the actual words of young people. The search led us to the diaries and letters of children throughout the world, written while they were living through the challenges of intolerance in its many forms." Although the piece focuses on contextualizing Brundibár in Terezin, it also journeys through many different world conflicts intercalating the different monologues with musical pieces in pastiche-style which combines the words of the children with music by composers Antonín Dvořák, César Franck and Giacomo Puccini among others. The piece was revised for a second production in 2019.

On February 8–9, 2019, Project Opera, the youth opera training program of the Minnesota Opera, performed Brundibar (Kushner translation) at the Lab Theatre in Downtown Minneapolis.

In 2019, Brundibár was performed by WNO Youth Opera in the Wales Millennium Centre, Cardiff.

On November 4-7, 2021, the Virginia Children's Chorus Concert Choir performed Brundibar preceded by Elie Wiesel's play, The Trial of God, at Christopher Newport University's Ferguson Center for the Arts in Newport News, Virginia. The performance was shown as part of the University's Reflections on the Holocaust exhibition, where the two theatrical works were performed together for the first time.

In November 2025, Brundibár returns to Sarasota Opera for a 4th production again paired with the companion piece "Raise Up Your Voice: Intolerance Through the Voices of Children" created by Jessé Martins and Martha Collins.

== Recordings ==
- 1986 in German Sr. Maria Veronika Grüters
- 1991 in Czech. Koch International. rereleased Romantic Robot (RR1991) 2 CD-set: Terezín: The Music 1941-44 by FISYO (Filmový symfonický orchestr) Prague conducted by Mario Klemens and Bambini di Praga led by Bohumil Kulínský; this was the first available recording in Czech from a two-CD set produced by Alexander Goldscheider and released in 1991, which further contains Krása's string trio Tanec together with music from other leading Terezín composers, namely Viktor Ullmann, Pavel Haas and Gideon Klein
- 1993 in Czech: Channel Classics (CCS 5193) CD titled: Composers from Theresienstadt, 1941-1945: Hans Krása's Brundibár and František Domažlický's Czech Songs; Disman Radio Children's Ensemble, Prague, conducted by Joža Karas - in Czech; no texts 1993.
- 1995 in German: Live recording of the Austrian Broadcasting Corporation ORF of the Austrian Premiere by ARBOS-Company for Music and Theatre in 1995.
- 1995 Mladinski Zbor RTV Slovenija Conductor Nada Matošević, Padua, Fonit Cetra, licensed Hommage
- 1996 in English: Arabesque Recordings Z6680: Brundibar and Hebrew and Yiddish Folk Songs; Essex Children's Choir and members of the Vermont Symphony, conducted by Robert DeCormier; 1996 - in English, translation by Joža Karas.
- 1999 in German: EDA Edition Abseits, www.eda-records.com: Brundibar - Eine Oper fur Kinder; collegium iuvenum, Knabenchor Stuttgart, Madchenkantorei St. Eberhard, conducted by Friedemann Keck; 1999 - two-CD set, in German; the second CD is "Brundibar and the Children of Theresienstadt", a feature with Hannelore Wondschick.
- Tony Kushner 2006 in English: Naxos 8.570119; Brundibar and Lori Laitman's "I Never Saw Another Butterfly", under the title Music of Remembrance. Also includes Hans Krása's Overture for Small Orchestra. Northwest Boy Choir, conducted by Gerard Schwarz; 2006 - this recording is in English and is the Tony Kushner version.
- 2007 in Italiano: Hans Krása: Brundibár. Opera per Bambini in 2 Atti, Director: Volfango Dami. EMA Vinci records.

== Sources ==
- Karas, Joža Music in Terezin, 1941-1945 (1985), New York: Beaufort Books.
- Speeches by Ela Weissberger, Tucson, AZ, March #1, April 1, and April 2

=== "Hear My Voice" sources ===
- Gassen, Sarah Garecht. (2006) "Brundibar Written to Inspire Hope", Arizona Daily Star
- Reel, James. (2006) "Whoever Loves Justice", Tucson Weekly
