= Michael Kraus (baritone) =

Austrian operatic baritone (born 1957)

Michael Kraus (born 17 January 1957) is an Austrian operatic baritone.

== Life ==
=== Early years ===
Born in Vienna, Kraus first studied acting, historiography and Romance studies and worked for several years as an actor at "Die Komödianten" theatre in Vienna, where he was also responsible as director for the Austrian premiere of Herbert Achternbusch's Ella (1979). He also studied singing at the University of Music and Performing Arts Vienna with Kammersänger (KS) Otto Edelmann and KS Josef Greindl and the University of Music and Performing Arts Munich with Hanno Blaschke. He won several prizes at singing competitions (among others the International Hugo Wolf Academy, Vienna 1980, and the International Lieder Competition, Vienna 1982). Afterwards he finally decided to become a singer. He had his first stage engagements as a beginner at the Theater Aachen (1981–1984) and at the Theater Ulm (1984–1987).

In 1987, Kraus made his debut at the Vienna Volksoper as Guglielmo in Così fan tutte. From 1988 to 1992, he was a permanent ensemble member at the house and continued to appear regularly as a guest thereafter. In the course of the years he impersonated there as leading roles among others Papageno in The Magic Flute, Guglielmo in Così fan tutte, Leporello and the title role in Don Giovanni, Falke and Eisenstein in Die Fledermaus, Sixtus Beckmesser in Die Meistersinger von Nürnberg, the Music Teacher in Ariadne auf Naxos (new production, premiere: June 2009) and the title role in Gianni Schicchi (2012/13 season). In the 1991/92 season he sang the role of the poacher Haraschta in Janáček's opera The Cunning Little Vixen at the Vienna Volksoper. He also sang there in operettas, among others in the 1988/89 season the landlord Benozzo in Gasparone and in the 1989/90 season Fassbinder Lotteringhi in a new production of Boccaccio.

In the 1991/92 season, he also sang at the Vienna State Opera. In the following years, Papageno in particular became his international starring role.

=== Guest appearances ===
In 1988, Kraus sang the role of Leporello in a new production of Mozart's Don Giovanni under Nikolaus Harnoncourt in Amsterdam. In later ones he made guest appearances there as Stolzus in the Die Soldaten by Bernd Alois Zimmermann (2003 and 2010), as Franz/Fritz in Die tote Stadt (2005) as well as Faninal in Der Rosenkavalier (2011).

In the summer of 1988 he made a guest appearance at the Seefestspiele Mörbisch as Pappacoda in the operetta A Night in Venice. In 1991, he made his US debut at the San Francisco Opera with the role of Papageno. In 1993, he debuted at La Scala as Scherasmin in Oberon, where he later also appeared in Der Freischütz (2017) and Die Fledermaus (2018).

From 1994, Kraus was a regular guest at the Vlaamse Opera in Antwerp and Ghent, where he first enjoyed great success, among others, in the title role of Britten's opera Billy Budd (1994 and 1997). In the following years, he sang Fritz in The Dead City (1995), Dandini in La Cenerentola (1999), Beckmesser in Die Meistersinger von Nürnberg (2002), Don Alfonso in Così fan tutte (2003) and Jaroslav Prus in Věc Makropulos (2016).

From 2000, Kraus was also a permanent guest at the Komische Oper Berlin for several years (including Lescaut in Manon Lescaut, Enrico Ashton in Lucia di Lammermoor, Marcello in La Bohème, Mercutio in Roméo et Juliette). In 2000, he made his role debut as Conte di Luna in Verdi's opera Il trovatore in concert performances in Zagreb and Ljubljana. In the opening premiere of the 2000/01 season, he sang the title role in the world premiere of the opera Don Quixote en Barcelona by José Luis Turina at the Teatro del Liceu in Barcelona. In the 2004/05 season, Kraus sang the double role of Frank/Fritz in a new production of the opera Die tote Stadt at De Nederlandse Opera in Amsterdam (conductor: Ingo Metzmacher, director: Willy Decker).

In the 2009/10 season, he sang the role of Don Carlo di Vargas in La forza del destino at the Mecklenburgisches Staatstheater Schwerin. In November 2010 he took on the role of Stolzius in die Soldaten at the Nederlandse Opera in Amsterdam (musical director: Hartmut Haenchen; director: Willy Decker). In the 2011/12 season, he sang Eisenstein in the operetta Die Fledermaus at the Oper Frankfurt. In March/April 2012, he sang the role of Schlachter in the premiere of Rumor, the new opera by Christian Jost (director: Guy Joosten).

In 2012/13 he also made guest appearances at the Berlin State Opera (among others as Faninal under Sir Simon Rattle). At the Oper Leipzig, he made his role debut in the 2012/13 season as Donner in Das Rheingold under the musical direction of Ulf Schirmer. In 2013, Kraus made his debut at the Zurich Opera House (die Soldaten), where he also sang the Heerrufer in Lohengrin and Orest in Elektra.

In 2014, he made his debut at the Glyndebourne Festival Opera as Faninal, which he repeated there in 2018. In 2015, he sang Thoas in Iphigénie en Tauride at the Salzburger Pfingst- und Sommerfestspiele. This was followed in 2016 by debuts at the Paris Opéra Bastille (Die Meistersinger von Nürnberg) and the Royal Opera House London (Tannhäuser) and at the Semperoper Dresden (as Donner in Das Rheingold). Since 2017, Kraus has participated in a new production of Der Ring des Nibelungen at the Deutsche Oper am Rhein in Düsseldorf, where he sings Alberich for the first time.

Kraus has made further guest appearances at the Hamburg and Munich State Operas, the Grand Théâtre de Genève, the Finnish National Opera and Ballet, the Teatro Massimo in Palermo and the Teatro Regio di Torino, among others. He has sung in France, Hungary, Sweden, Greece (1991 in Athens), Israel, Brazil, Chile and Japan. He has also performed in concert and recital.

== Repertoire and recordings ==
Kraus initially sang lyric baritone roles with a focus on Mozart (Papageno, Guglielmo, Don Giovanni). In the course of his career, his voice changed over the course of his career from cavalier baritone (such as Valentin in Faust, Conte di Luna in Il Trovatore, Don Carlos di Vargas in La forza del destino or Germont in La Traviata) to character baritone (among others, Jago in La Traviata). Iago in Otello).

In 1990, Kraus sang Papageno in a recording of Mozart's The Magic Flute with the Vienna Philharmonic under the conduct of Sir Georg Solti (Decca). He also appeared several times in the Decca series Entartete Musik in Jonny spielt auf by Ernst Krenek, Der gewaltige Hahnrei by Berthold Goldschmidt (Cannes Classic Award nomination), in the title role of The Emperor of Atlantis by Viktor Ullmann, Die Vögel by Walter Braunfels (1998 nomination for the Grammy Award), in The Betrothal in a Dream by Hans Krása and Requiem Ebraico by Erich Zeisl.

Other complete opera recordings with Michael Kraus include Turandot by Ferruccio Busoni under Kent Nagano (Virgin Classics), Der Rosenkavalier under Bernard Haitink (EMI) and Die Harmonie der Welt under Marek Janowski (Wergo).

In addition to his performances as a singer, Kraus has also worked as an opera director and translator of opera libretti (Mozart-Da Ponte trilogy and Elisir d'amore by Donizetti). In 2016, he submitted a dissertation on Musical Modernism at the Opera Houses of Berlin and Vienna 1945–1989 to the Department of Contemporary History of the University of Vienna, which was published in book form in 2017.

== Publications ==
- Michael Kraus: Die musikalische Moderne an den Staatsopern von Berlin und Wien 1945–1989. Paradigmen nationaler Kulturidentitäten im Kalten Krieg, Springer Verlag: Berlin/Heidelberg/New York 2017. ISBN 978-3-476-04353-5.
