= Four Orchestral Songs =

Four Orchestral Songs may refer to:

- Four Orchestral Songs (Schoenberg), composition by Arnold Schoenberg
- Four Orchestral Songs (Krása), composition by Hans Krása

== See also ==
- Four Songs (disambiguation)
- Four Last Songs, composition by Richard Strauss
