= Alexandra Čvanová =

Ukrainian-Czech operatic soprano

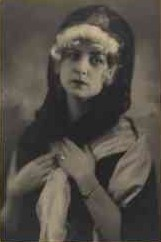
Alexandra Čvanová

Alexandra Čvanová (25 April 1897 – 20 May 1939) was a Ukrainian-Czech operatic soprano. She was the creator of roles in operas by Leoš Janáček and Pavel Haas.

== Biography ==
She was born in Odesa, where she studied music and drama, and sang in the opera house there. In 1923, she moved to Czechoslovakia and in 1926 became a soloist at the National Theatre in Brno, initially under the surname Remislawská. Her roles there included Jaroslavna in Prince Igor, Tatiana in Eugene Onegin and Lisa in The Queen of Spades, Krasava in Libuše and the title-roles in Jenůfa and Rusalka. In 1926, she created the role of Emilia Marty in Janáček's The Makropulos Affair and in 1938 the role of Amaranta in Haas's Šarlatán.

She died in a car accident near Jihlava at the age of 42.

== Sources ==
- Biography at Český hudební slovník osob a institucí (in Czech)
