= Lothar Zagrosek =

German conductor (born 1942)

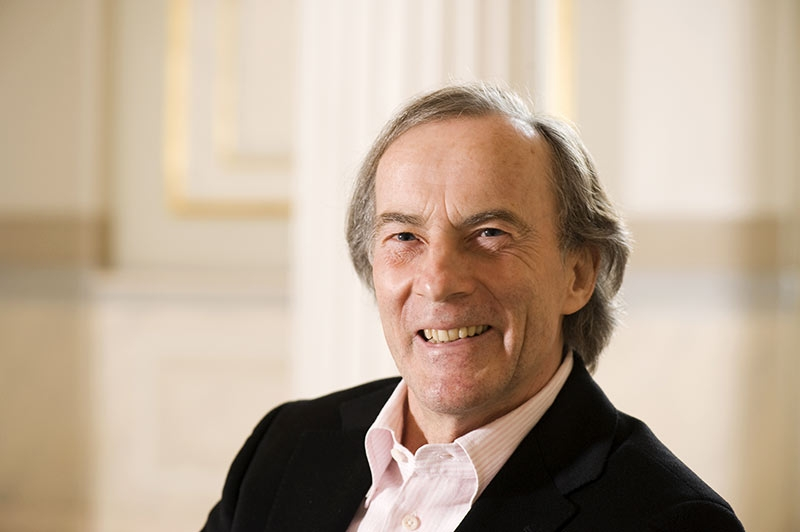
Lothar Zagrosek (2008)

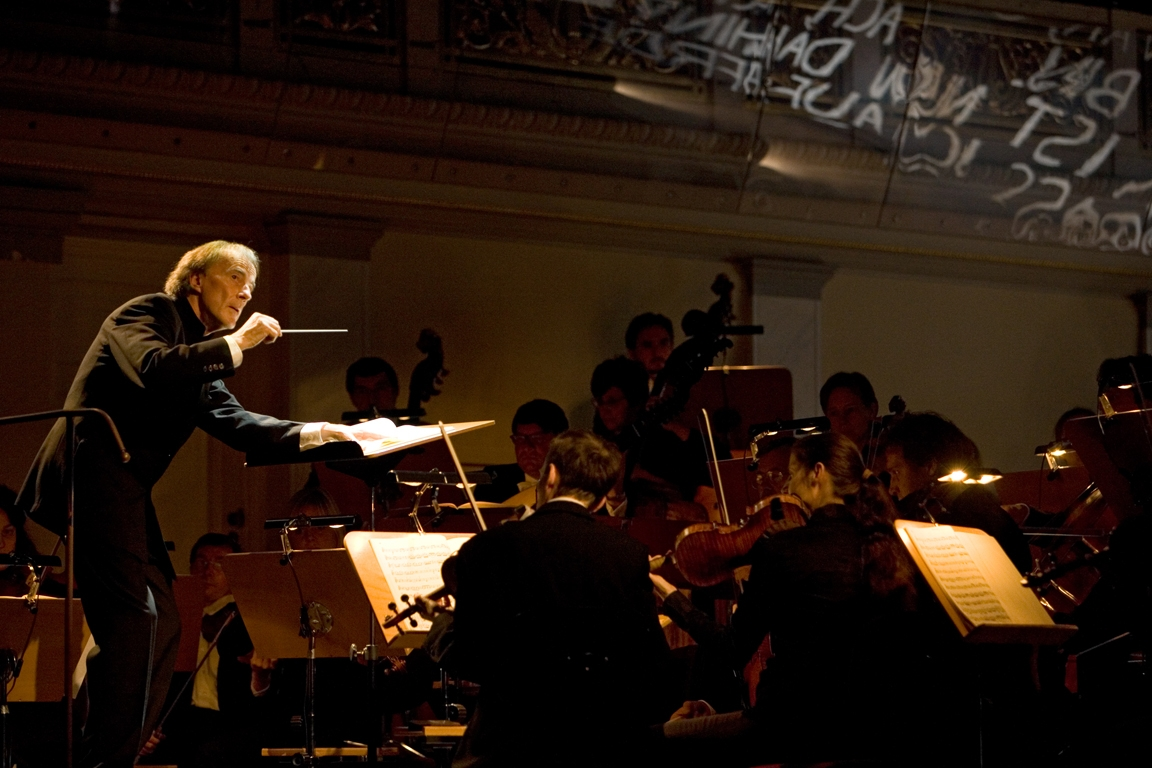

Lothar Zagrosek (born 13 November 1942 in Otting, Germany) is a German conductor. As a youth, he sang in the Regensburg Cathedral choir, including performances as the First Boy in The Magic Flute at the 1954 Salzburg Festival. From 1962 to 1967, Zagrosek studied conducting with Hans Swarowsky, István Kertész, Bruno Maderna and Herbert von Karajan.

Zagrosek was chief conductor of the Vienna Radio Symphony Orchestra from 1982 to 1986. He was principal guest conductor of the BBC Symphony Orchestra from 1985 to 1988. Between 1990 and 1992, he conducted regularly at the Leipzig Opera. In 1995, he became principal guest conductor of the Junge Deutsche Philharmonie. From 1997 to 2006, he was chief conductor at the Württemberg opera house in Stuttgart. From 2006 to 2011, he was chief conductor of the Konzerthausorchester Berlin, the former Berlin Symphony Orchestra (Berliner Sinfonie-Orchester).

== Selected recordings ==
Among Zagrosek's commercial recordings are several issues in Decca's Entartete Musik series, including the following works:

- Walter Braunfels: Die Vögel
- Hanns Eisler: Deutsche Sinfonie
- Berthold Goldschmidt: Der gewaltige Hahnrei
- Paul Hindemith: Der Dämon
- Hans Krása: Verlobung im Traum
- Ernst Krenek: Symphony No. 2, Jonny spielt auf
- Franz Schreker: Die Gezeichneten, Der Geburtstag der Infantin
- Erwin Schulhoff: Die Mondsüchtige
- Viktor Ullmann: Der Kaiser von Atlantis

Zagrosek conducted and recorded Wagner's opera cycle Der Ring des Nibelungen with the Stuttgart State Opera on the Naxos label (NXS 8660170). In addition, Zagrosek has recorded contemporary music, including works of Michael Torke.

Cultural offices
Preceded by Leif Segerstam	Chief Conductor, Vienna Radio Symphony Orchestra; 1982–1986	Succeeded by Pinchas Steinberg
Preceded by Eliahu Inbal	Chief Conductor, Konzerthausorchester Berlin; 2006–2011	Succeeded by Ivan Fischer
