= Šarlatán =

Opera by Pavel Haas

- Opera by Pavel Haas
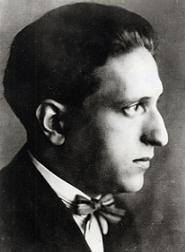
- The composer and librettist
- Translation: The Charlatan
- Librettist: Haas
- Language: Czech
- Based on: Doktor Eisenbart by Josef Winckler
- Premiere: 2 April 1938; Zemské Divadlo v Brně

Šarlatán (English: The Charlatan), Op. 14, is a tragicomic opera in three acts (seven scenes) by Pavel Haas to his own Czech libretto, after a 1929 German-language novel, Doktor Eisenbart, by Josef Winckler (1881–1966), which was based on the life of the travelling surgeon Johann Andreas Eisenbarth.

== Performance history ==
The opera was composed between 1934 and 1937. Haas completed his work on the libretto on 1 July 1934. Later, he was forced to conceal his inspiration, because a collaboration between a German writer and a Jewish composer was forbidden by Nuremberg Laws. The composer removed from the libretto any association with the original German background and he changed the name of the main character (Eisenbart) to the Czech equivalent, Pustrpalk. A six-movement Suite (Op. 14) based on themes from the opera, intended to publicise the premiere, was broadcast by the Brno Radio Orchestra on 14 June 1937. In the event, the premiere was twice postponed, but eventually took place at the Zemské Divadlo v Brně, now the Mahen Theatre, Brno, on 2 April 1938. The conductor was Guido Arnoldi, the director was Rudolf Walter, the designer was František Muzika and the choreography was by Ivo Váňa-Psota.

The opera was not seen again on stage until Wexford Festival Opera's October 1998 production, although concert performances were given in Prague in June 1997; these were recorded by Decca and issued on CD as part of their Entartete Musik series.

== Instrumentation ==
Piccolo, 2 flutes, 2 oboes, English horn, 2 clarinets (B♭), bass clarinet (B♭), 2 bassoons, contrabassoon, 4 horns (F), 3 trumpets (B♭), 5 trombones, tuba, harp, xylophone, timpani, cymbals, small and large drums, triangle, violins I and II, viola, cello and double bass.

== Roles ==
Roles, voice types, premiere cast
Role		Voice type	Premiere cast, 2 April 1938 Conductor: Guido Arnoldi
Pustrpalk, a travelling quack doctor, the title's charlatan		baritone	Václav Bednář
Rozina, his wife		soprano	Božena Žlábková
Members of Pustrpalk's troupe:	Bakalář (Bachelor), dressed as Harlequin	tenor	Gustav Talman
Members of Pustrpalk's troupe:	Kyška (Sour milk), a cook, dressed as Scapino	tenor	Josef Kejř
Members of Pustrpalk's troupe:	Pavučina (Cobweb), dressed as Pantalone	bass	Vladimír Jedenáctík
Members of Pustrpalk's troupe:	Zavináč (Pickled herring), dressed as Pierrot	tenor	Antonín Pelz
Members of Pustrpalk's troupe:	Ohnižer, (Fire-eater), dressed as Pulcinella	tenor	Pavel Mrázek
Members of Pustrpalk's troupe:	Provazolezec, (Tightrope walker), dressed as Columbine	bass	Leonid Pribytkov
Members of Pustrpalk's troupe:	Krotitel hadů (Snake-charmer), dressed as Brighella	bass	Vlastimil Šíma
Members of Pustrpalk's troupe:	Theriac seller (Potion seller)	bass	Jan Frank
Members of Pustrpalk's troupe:	2 Servants	baritone bass	Josef Příhoda; František Šíma
Amaranta, a beauty		soprano or mezzo-soprano	Alexandra Čvanová
Jochimus, a monk		baritone	Géza Fišer
his servant		tenor	Karel Spurný
Apothecary		bass	Jan Frank
Town physician		bass	Bedřich Zavadil
Deserter		tenor	Karel Spurný
Innkeeper		tenor	Karel Vacek
Šereda (monster), a travelling healer		tenor	Emil Olšovský
his servant			Otto Strejček
The King		bass	Nikola Cvejić
3 Students		tenor baritone bass	Antonín Pelz; Jan Frank; František Šíma
A man with a crutch		tenor	Antonín Vacek
Another man			Josef Kopelský
Carpentry apprentice			Josef Sokol
The voice of the mad miller			Rudolf Walter
Dance master			Josef Sokol
Horn player			Ladislav Huňka
Darmožrout			Pavel Korenkov
Soldier			Josef Tupý
Villagers, children, Pustrpalk's musicians, soldiers, porters

== Synopsis ==
Place: A village in central Europe
Time: After the Thirty Years' War

=== Act 1 ===
Scene 1: Outside the village near a war-damaged mill

Doctor Pustrpalk's troupe are putting on a show to attract the villagers and telling stories about the doctor's miraculous cures. He arrives and offers advice and cures to all and sundry. Theriac pills made of herbs and honey are handed out, and a deserter who wants to die is given "arsenic" but recovers when he takes the pills. Amaranta, complaining of pains caused by giving birth, is carried in on a stretcher. Pustrpalk gets her to sit in a basket of stinging nettles, and despite her screams it appears that she is cured. The two are attracted to each other and he invites her to join his troupe, telling her that he dislikes his shrewish wife Rozina. She leaves. As the villagers praise the doctor, the monk Jochimus appears and threatens to expose him. Amid the jeers of the crowd, Jochimus goes off to find Amaranta.

Scene 2: In the shadow of the mill

In the evening, the men of the village scavenge in the ruins. They wonder at Pustrpalk's endless travels, his achievements and his constant good humour.

Scene 3: At Pustrpalk's encampment

A few days later, Pustrpalk's troupe are making preparations to move to their next venue. Amaranta's unexpectedly large and flamboyant dress will clearly not allow her to enter the waggon. There is a commotion, during which Jochimus arrives to rescue Amaranta, but he is chased away by the villagers. Pustrpalk's wife, Rozina, catches him with Amaranta, and a furious argument between the two women develops, to the amusement of the villagers. Pustrpalk slashes Amaranta's dress to enable her to get into the waggon, and they, Rozina and the troupe depart. As they leave, Jochimus, crying "Revenge!", appears amid the laughing crowd.

=== Act 2 ===
Scene 1: Outside the ruined mill

A month later, Pustrpalk reflects on the devastation caused by war and the declining health of the old miller. With Rozina watching, Amaranta behaves coolly towards him. Zavináč and Provazolezec suspect that Pustrpalk will disappear with Amaranta and the troupe's money, and plan to rob him while he sleeps. Overhearing their plot, he confronts them, but then decides that he will share out the gold among the entire troupe. They all think that he has gone mad, but he does indeed dole out the money. Drink flows freely, and soon Zavináč and Provazolezec are arguing about which of them deserves the credit for the strange turn of events. The row awakens the old miller, who throws down a lantern which kills Zavináč. The men set light to the mill, destroying it and killing the miller, to Amaranta's horror. As the troupe rejoice drunkenly, they do not notice that Pustrpalk and Amaranta have departed.

Scene 2: A fairground

A year later, Šereda, another quack doctor with his own troupe, is extolling his magic oven, which the townspeople investigate. Pustrpalk and Amaranta, accompanied by Bakalář carrying Pustrpalk's potions, appear, and amicably agree to join forces with Šereda. The latter warns Pustrpalk that the King is in the area, looking for dissidents and beautiful women. Masked revellers in fancy dress arrive together with a tall peasant, the King in disguise. Feeling faint, the King calls for Pustrpalk's latest remedy. It proves so successful that he rejects Pustrpalk's invitation to join his troupe and instead hands out gold and medals. Pustrpalk in his hour of triumph looks around for Amaranta, but he is deflated when he discovers that she has been spirited away by Jochimus.

=== Act 3 ===
Scene 1: Outside Pustrpalk's tent

Several years later, Jochimus, gravely ill, visits Pustrpalk and apologises for his past behaviour. He asks Pustrpalk to treat him and is carried into the tent. Pustrpalk performs the operation and emerges, but soon afterwards it is clear that the monk is dead. Pustrpalk fears that he will be hanged, but, before he can flee, some soldiers and an apothecary, summoned by Jochimus's servant, surround the tent. A doctor and a number of villagers appear, some vilifying Pustrpalk and others praising him. They eventually unite to call for the charlatan to be strung up, but Pustrpalk has made his escape.

Scene 2: Beside the newly-rebuilt mill

Five years later, Pustrpalk's troupe discuss their master, who is drinking too much and no longer recognises them. He shambles in, asking for a drink. When three students arrive, Pustrpalk buys them drinks and they eventually work out that he is the famous doctor. This gives him a new lease of life, and the members of the troupe reminisce about some strange cases that he has treated. A drinking-song develops but suddenly Pustrpalk has a vision of Jochimus, with offstage voices chanting "Charlatan!". He strikes out, falls, asks God to forgive him and dies. All kneel and make the sign of the cross.

== Recording ==
- Vladimír Chmelo (Doktor Pustrpalk), Anda-Louise Bogza (Rozina), Jiří Kubík (Jochimus), Jitka Svobodová (Amaranta), Ladislav Mlejnek (Pavučina), Leo Marian Vodička (Kyška), Miroslav Švejda (Bakalář), Prague Philharmonic Choir, Prague State Opera Orchestra, conductor Israel Yinon; Decca Records 460 042-2 (1997)

== Notes ==
=== Sources ===
- Peduzzi, Lubomír [in Czech] (1993). Pavel Haas (in Czech). Brno: Muzejní a vlastivědná společnost v Brně. ISBN 80-85048-41-8.
