= Josef Karas =

Josef Karas may refer to:

- Josef Karas (athlete) (born 1978), Czech decathlete
- Joža Karas (1926–2008), Polish-born, Czech-American musician and teacher
- Josef Karas (politician) (1867–1943), Czech and Czechoslovak lawyer, politician and interwar senator
