= Sergey Malov =

Sergey Malov may refer to:

- Sergey Malov (linguist)
- Sergey Malov (musician)
