= Four Songs =

Four Songs or 4 Songs may refer to:

== Music ==
=== Classical compositions ===
- A number of compositions by Nikolai Rimsky-Korsakov (1844–1908)
- Four Songs, a 1954 composition by Igor Stravinsky
- Four Songs (original title Vier Lieder), Op. 2, an 1899/1900 composition by Arnold Schoenberg
- Four Songs (original title Vier Lieder), Op. 2, a 1909/10 composition by Alban Berg (1885–1935)

=== Albums and EPs ===
- Four Songs (Alexi Murdoch EP), 2002
- Four Songs (Blood Orange EP), 2022
- Four Songs (Jonezetta EP), 2005
- Four Songs (Live EP), 1991
- Four Songs (Matt Pond PA EP), 2004
- Four Songs by Arthur Russell, a 2007 tribute EP
- 4 Songs, a 1988 EP by The Bats
- 4 Songs, a 1991 EP by Gray Matter
- 4 Songs, a 2006 EP by Belleruche
- 4 Songs, a 1996 EP by I Hate Myself

== See also ==
- Four Orchestral Songs (disambiguation)
  - Four Orchestral Songs (Schoenberg), a composition by Arnold Schoenberg
  - Four Orchestral Songs (Krása), a song cycle by Hans Krása
- Vier ernste Gesänge (Four Serious Songs) Op. 121, a song cycle by Johannes Brahms
- Four Last Songs, a song cycle by Richard Strauss
- Four Last Songs (Vaughan Williams), a song cycle by Ralph Vaughan Williams
- Quatre chansons cambodgiennes (1931) and Quatre chansons françaises (1933), by Henri Casadesus
- "Four Songs for Voice, Violin and Piano", by Arthur Bliss
- Cuatro canciones sefardíes (1965), by Joaquín Rodrigo
- Quatre Chansons Françaises (1928), by Benjamin Britten
- "Four Songs For Mezzo-Soprano And Piano", by David Dubery
- Quatro Canciones de García Lorca Op. 8, by Jouni Kaipainen
- A number of compositions by Edvard Grieg
