= Anda-Louise Bogza =

Romanian opera singer (1965–2025)

- Bogza in the 1980s
- Born: 27 February 1965; Piatra Neamț, Romania
- Died: 13 December 2025 (aged 60); Prague, Czech Republic
- Education: George Enescu Conservatory; National University of Music Bucharest; Academy of Performing Arts in Prague
- Occupation: Operatic soprano
- Years active: 1994–2025
- Employers: State Opera; National Theatre
- Awards: Thalia Award
- Website: www.andalouisebogza.com

Anda-Louise Bogza (27 February 1965 – 13 December 2025) was a Romanian operatic soprano. Based in Prague at the State Opera and the National Theatre, she made an international career, especially portraying Verdi heroines such as Aida and Leonora in Il trovatore. She performed another signature role, Puccini's Tosca, first at the Grand Théâtre de Bordeaux in 2005, and then at the Maggio Musicale Fiorentino, the Bavarian State Opera, Oper Frankfurt, New Israeli Opera, Grand Théâtre de Luxembourg, Slovak National Theatre, in Japan, at the Romanian National Opera, and at the Salzburg Festival.

== Life and career ==
Born in Piatra Neamț on 27 February 1965, Bogza studied music at the George Enescu Conservatory in Iași, the National University of Music Bucharest, and at the Academy of Performing Arts in Prague (piano, singing, and harpsichord). She began her career performing at the State Opera and the National Theatre in Prague. She remained committed to both of those houses for the rest of her life. Among the roles which she portrayed in Prague were Abigaille in Verdi's Nabucco, Amelia in Un ballo in maschera, Donna Anna in Mozart's Don Giovanni, Desdemona in Otello, Elisabetta in Don Carlo, Giorgetta in Puccini's Il Tabarro, Leonora in Il Trovatore, Lisa in Tcaikovsky's Pique Dame, Minnie in La Fanciulla del West, Sina in Hans Krása's Verlobung im Traum, and the title roles in Verdi's Aida, Janáček's Jenůfa and Káťa Kabanová, and Puccini's Manon Lescaut, Tosca, and Turandot.

Bogza maintained an active international career as a freelance artist. She appeared as Donna Anna in Mozart's Don Giovanni in Opéra de Marseille in 1997. She portrayed Aida at the Vienna State Opera in 2001, the Berlin State Opera, the Deutsche Oper Berlin, and the Leipzig Opera. Bogza portrayed Tosca at the Grand Théâtre de Bordeaux in 2005, at the Maggio Musicale Fiorentino, conducted by Zubin Mehta and the Bavarian State Opera in 2007, Oper Frankfurt, the New Israeli Opera, the Grand Théâtre de Luxembourg, the Slovak National Theatre, in Japan, the Romanian National Opera, and at the Salzburg Festival. Another signature role, Leonora in Il Trovatore, brought her to the stages of the Hamburg State Opera, the Hungarian State Opera, the Royal Danish Theatre, the Teatro de la Maestranza, and to opera houses in the United States. She also sang at Suntory Hall in Tokyo and Opéra de Marseille. In 2005, she made her first appearance at the Opéra National de Paris in the title role of Dvořák's Rusalka.

Bogza later resided in the Czech Republic. In the 2009–2010 season, she was scheduled to sing Donna Anna and Aida in Prague and Abigaille at the National Theatre Brno.

Bogza died in Prague on 13 December 2025, at the age of 60, after a long illness.

== Awards ==
In 1994, Bogza won both the First Prize and the Audience Prize at the Vienna International Singing Competition. She was honored with the Thalia Award in 2007.

== Repertoire ==
Bogza's repertoire included the following roles:

- Boito:
  - Mefistofele – Elena
  - Nerone – Asteria
- Dvořák: Rusalka – Rusalka, Foreign Princess
- Gottfried von Einem: Der Prozeß – Fräulein Bürstner
- Giordano: Andrea Chénier – Maddalena di Coigny
- Janáček:
  - Jenůfa – title role
  - Katya Kabanova – title role
- Hans Krása: Verlobung im Traum – Sina
- Mascagni: Cavalleria rusticana – Santuzza
- Mozart:
  - Don Giovanni – Donna Anna
  - Le Nozze di Figaro – The Countess
- Offenbach: Les Contes d'Hoffman – Giulietta
- Puccini:
  - La fanciulla del West – Minnie
  - Manon Lescaut – title role
  - La rondine – title role
  - Il tabarro – Giorgetta
  - Tosca – title role
  - Turandot – Liù, title role
- R. Strauss: Salome – title role
- Tchaikovsky: The Queen of Spades – Lisa
- Verdi:
  - Aida – title role
  - Un ballo in maschera – Amelia
  - Don Carlos – Elisabetta
  - La forza del destino – Leonora
  - Macbeth – Lady Macbeth
  - Nabucco – Abigaille
  - Otello – Desdemona
  - Il trovatore – Leonora
- Wagner:
  - Lohengrin – Elsa
  - Tannhäuser – Elisabeth
