= Hawthorne String Quartet =

American string quartet

The Hawthorne String Quartet is an American string quartet, all four of whose members are players from the Boston Symphony Orchestra. Although its repertoire ranges from the 18th century to contemporary works, the ensemble specializes in works by composers who were interned at the Terezín concentration camp during World War II and other "Entartete Musik" composers. Their recordings of music by three of these composers, Pavel Haas, Erwin Schulhoff and Hans Krása, were released on the Decca Records Entartete Musik series.

== History ==
A Boston-based ensemble, the Hawthorne String Quartet takes its name from the New England novelist Nathaniel Hawthorne and was founded in 1986. Its violist, Mark Ludwig, is also the Founder and Director of the Terezin Music Foundation. Since its founding, the Quartet have toured both in the United States and internationally, and performed in Prague in 1991 at the commemorations marking the 50th anniversary of the first transportations of Jews from that city to the Terezin concentration camp. They have since returned several times to Prague, most notably for the 2009 and 2010 editions of the Prague Spring International Music Festival. At the 2009 Festival, they gave a concert to mark the inauguration of the Terezín Living Legacy Commission, playing works by Josef Suk, Gideon Klein, Charles Ives, Elliott Carter and the world premiere of Pavel Zemek's Zvony světla (Bells of Light). At the 2010 Festival, they played in the world premiere of André Previn's Clarinet Sonata with Thomas Martin on clarinet and the composer on piano.

One of the ensemble's more unusual collaborations, was their 2009 performance at the Tanglewood Music Festival where they played Hans Krása's String Quartet while artist Jim Schantz simultaneously created a landscape painting in response to the music. The Quartet also perform for the community outreach programs of both the Boston Symphony Orchestra and the Terezín Chamber Music Foundation, and since 1998 have been artists-in-residence at Boston College, where Mark Ludwig also teaches music in the Faculty of Jewish Studies.

== Members ==
- Mark Ludwig, viola
- Ronan Lefkowitz, violin
- Si-Jing Huang, violin
- Sato Knudsen, cello

== Discography ==
- Chamber Music from Theresienstadt – Channel Classics Records CCS 1691
- Silenced Voices – Northeastern Records NR 248 (also toured in concert)
- Samuel Coleridge-Taylor: Chamber Music – Koch International 3-7056-2
- Pavel Haas and Hans Krása: String Quartets – Decca 440 853-2
- Schulhoff: Concertos Alla Jazz – Decca 444 819-2
- Finding a Voice: Musicians in Terezin – Terezín Chamber Music Foundation Collection 34-001
- Mistletoe Sax and Strings – North Star Music NS 164
- Sax Across America – North Star Music NS 176
- Virtuoso Trumpet – Kleos Classics KL 5114
- Cradle Songs: A Collection of Lullabies from Around the World – IHJ Productions
- An Introduction to Entartete Musik – Decca 452-664-2
- Thomas Oboe Lee String Quartets – Koch International 3-7452-2-III
- Concert for Terezin – Terezín Chamber Music Foundation, Turquoise Bee Records 34-002
- David L. Post String Quartets Nos. 2-4 - Naxos 8.559661

== Film scores ==
Documentaries

- Dessa: A Legacy From Theresienstadt
- Entartete Musik: The Birth of a Project
- In the Shadow of the Reich: Nazi Medicine
- The Last Dance (Maurice Sendak and Pilobolus)
- Terezin: Life from death
- Mr. Death: The Rise and Fall of Fred A. Leuchter, Jr.

Feature films

- Schindler's List
- The Secret of Roan Inish

Animated films

- Lost Momentum (by Scott Snibbe)
