= IHJ =

IHJ may refer to:

- Institut za hrvatski jezik, Croatian for the Institute of Croatian Language
- IHJ Productions, producer of Cradle Songs: A Collection of Lullabies from Around the World by the Hawthorne String Quartet
- International House of Japan, cultural exchange organization
