= Pavel Haas Quartet =

Czech string quartet

The Pavel Haas Quartet's first album. (Released in 2006 on Supraphon SU 3877-2 131)

The Pavel Haas Quartet is a Czech string quartet founded in 2002. Their debut album, featuring the second string quartets of Haas and Janáček, received the 2007 Gramophone Award for Chamber music. Reviewer David Fanning described their interpretation as "streamlined but full-blooded". In 2011, their recording of Dvořák’s String Quartets Op. 106 and Op. 96 won Gramophone magazine’s "Recording of the Year" award, the publication’s highest accolade.

== Formation ==
The first violinist Veronika Jarůšková was inspired to form the quartet after she attended concerts by the Škampa Quartet in which her husband Peter Jarůšek was the cellist. She recruited other players in Prague, some of whom had studied with the same teachers. Initially the group consisted of, besides Jarůšková, Kateřina Gemrotová (second violin), Pavel Nikl (violist), and Lukáš Polák (cellist). After its formation Polák decided to leave because of incompatibility, so the two quartets ended up exchanging cellists, with Jarůškova's husband joining the Haas Quartet and Polák joining the Škampa Quartet. Later the second violinist (Gemrotová) was replaced by Marie Fuxová, who in September 2008 was replaced by Eva Karová, the youngest member in the group at 25 years of age (in November 2009); the oldest was only 33. In July 2012, Karová was herself replaced by Marek Zwiebel as second violinist. Pavel Nikl played the viola until 2016, Radim Sedmidubský in 2016-2017, Jiří Kabát in 2018-2019, Luosha Fang in 2021-2022, Karel Untermüller in 2022, later Šimon Truszka.

The quartet is named after the Czech composer Pavel Haas (1899–1944), who was deported from Czechoslovakia in 1941, initially imprisoned at the work camp Terezin, and finally murdered at Auschwitz. Although aware of the significance of the circumstances of Haas's final years, the group did not intend to make a statement about The Holocaust, but rather selected the name primarily because of his importance to Czech music and in particular because of his three string quartets, all of which they have now recorded. Jarůšková has said: "We know personally the daughter of Pavel Haas. She doesn't like to speak about the time before the war. She showed us some papers and a book he wrote about her when she was born." Jarůšek added: "She also showed us the reviews. Every review of his Second Quartet was bad."

== Mentors ==
The Haas Quartet has studied and worked with members of the Quartetto Italiano, Quatuor Mosaïques, Borodin Quartet, and the Amadeus Quartet. Other important mentors include Walter Levin (founder of the LaSalle Quartet) and particularly the Smetana Quartet's viola player, Milan Škampa, who worked with the group over a period of many years. Jarůšková has said, "I once asked Milan Škampa to teach me how to build a quartet, how to live the life of a quartet. He said 'It's the most beautiful prison in the music world.'"

== Awards and critical reception ==
The group won the 2004 "Vittorio E. Rimbotti" award in Florence. Their recording contract with Supraphon came from winning the Prague Spring Competition in May 2005, and has resulted in four CDs (see Recordings). The group got another early boost by winning First Place at the Premio Paolo Borciani competition in Italy in June 2005. The group also received a Special Ensemble Scholarship from the Borletti-Buitoni Trust in 2010.

Besides their first CD, which won the 2007 Gramophone Award as the best chamber music recording of the year, their second CD with the first Janáček quartet and the first and third quartets of Haas was selected by the Gramophone as an "Editor's Choice". Rob Cowan, the reviewer, wrote: "To describe a CD as musically important is to court a certain level of controversy..., but I'll stick my neck out and claim extreme importance for this release. ... This is a superb release that deserves not merely to bask in the reflected glory of its predecessor, but to share in it." Their third Supraphon disc with the two Prokofiev quartets (No. 1 in B minor, Op. 50, and No. 2 in F major, Op. 92) and his Sonata for Two Violins, Op. 56, was also selected by Gramophone as an "Editor's Choice" and was described by the reviewer David Gutman as "pitch perfect".

In April 2011, the quartet's recorded performance of Dvořák's last string quartet (No. 13 in G major, Op. 106) was proposed by reviewer Jan Smaczny for BBC Radio 3's "CD Review: Building a Library" as his personal top recommendation among rival performances.

== Tours ==
During 2006–2007 the group performed in France, Germany, Italy and Great Britain, including at the Musée du Louvre, Paris, Alte Oper Frankfurt and Philharmonie Essen.

In 2007–2008 more concert tours came their way after they were nominated by the Cologne Philharmonie as one of the European Concert Hall Organisation (ECHO) "Rising Stars". Tour venues included the Vienna Konzerthaus, Salzburg Mozarteum, Amsterdam Concertgebouw, Palais des Beaux-Arts, Brussels, Cité de la Musique, Paris, Cologne Philharmonie, Festspielhaus Baden-Baden, Stockholm Konserthuset, Birmingham Symphony Hall and Carnegie Hall's Weill Recital Hall in New York.

From September 2007 to September 2009 the quartet participated in the BBC Radio 3 New Generation Artists scheme. This program annually selects six to seven young artists and ensembles from around the world to make BBC recordings for broadcast and also sponsors a series of concerts in the United Kingdom. This relationship resulted in the group's recording of three Beethoven string quartets (Op. 18 No.4, Op. 95, and Op. 135).

In the summer of 2009 the group travelled to Japan performing in Tokyo, Nagoya, and Musashino and recording the two Janáček quartets and the third Haas quartet for NHK television. From Japan they continued on to Australia with concerts in Sydney, Adelaide, Perth, Newcastle, Melbourne, and Hobart which featured the world premiere performances of Australian composer Paul Stanhope's String Quartet No. 2 (2009).

In the fall they performed in the United Kingdom, Switzerland, and Germany. A concert in Bonn on 20 September included the Haydn String Quartet in D minor, Op. 76, No. 2 ("Fifths") and the Dvořák String Quintet in E-flat major, Op. 97 (with violist Masumi Per Rostad of the Pacifica Quartet). The performance was recorded by Deutsche Welle and is available for download.

The European tour was followed by another tour to the United States with performances in Philadelphia, Middlebury, Vermont, Houston, Texas, and Worcester, Massachusetts. The fall tour included performances of Beethoven's String Quartet in F major, Op. 59, No. 1, Britten's Three Divertimenti, Dvořák's String Quartet Op. 106 in G major, Haas's String Quartet No. 2, Haydn's Op. 76 No. 2, Ravel's String Quartet in F major, Schubert's Allegro in C minor, D. 703 (Quartettsatz), and Shostakovich's String Quartet No. 10.

== Recordings ==
- 2006: Supraphon SU 3877-2 131 (1 CD; DDD; 57 min, 35 sec)
  - Works:
    - Janáček: String Quartet No. 2, "Intimate Letters"
    - Haas: String Quartet No. 2, "From the Monkey Mountains"
  - Colin Currie, percussion; Kateřina Gemrotová, second violin
  - Gramophone review
  - 2007 Gramophone Award for Chamber
  - BBC Music Magazine "Chamber Choice"; review
- 2007: Supraphon SU 3922-2 131 (1 CD; DDD; 54 min, 42 sec)
  - Works:
    - Janáček: String Quartet No. 1, after Tolstoy's "Kreutzer Sonata"
    - Haas: String Quartet No. 1
    - Haas: String Quartet No. 3
  - Marie Fuxová, second violin
  - Gramophone review ("Editor's Choice")
  - BBC Music Magazine review
- 2009: BBC Music Magazine BBC MM305 (1 CD; DDD; 68 min, 19 sec)
  - Works:
    - Beethoven: String Quartet Op. 18 No. 4
    - Beethoven: String Quartet Op. 135
    - Beethoven: String Quartet Op. 95 ("Quartetto serioso")
  - Eva Karová, second violin (Op. 18 No. 4, Op. 135)
  - Marie Fuxová, second violin (Op. 95)
  - BBC Music Magazine Cover CD, May 2009 (available only with magazine subscription)
- 2009: Deutsche Welle (mp3 for download; 52 min 55 sec)
  - Recorded 20 September 2009 at Beethoven-Haus, Bonn.
  - Works:
    - Haydn: String Quartet in D minor, Op. 76, No. 2 ("Fifths")
    - Dvořák: String Quintet in E-flat major, Op. 97
  - Masumi Per Rostad, viola (Dvořák)
- 2010: Supraphon SU 3957-2 (1 CD; DDD; 60 min, 22 sec)
  - Works:
    - Prokofiev: String Quartet No. 1 in B minor, Op. 50 (1930–31)
    - Prokofiev: Sonata for Two Violins in C major, Op. 56 (1932)
    - Prokofiev: String Quartet No. 2 in F major, Op. 92, on Kabardinian themes (1941)
  - Gramophone review ("Editor's Choice") Diapason d'Or 2010.
- 2010: Supraphon SU 4038-2 131 (1 CD; DDD; 63 min, 14 sec)
  - Works:
    - Dvořák: String Quartet No. 12, Op. 96
    - Dvořák: String Quartet No. 13, Op. 106
  - BBC Radio 3 critic Jan Smaczny's top choice among recorded performances
  - Won "Recording of the Year" as well as top chamber music recording at the 2011 Gramophone Awards.
- 2013: Supraphon SU 4110-2 (2 CD; DDD; 37 min, 51 sec and 53 min 51 sec)
  - Works:
    - Schubert: String Quartet No. 14 in D minor, "Death and the Maiden"
    - Schubert: String Quintet in C Major, with Danjulo Ishizaka, cello
- 2015: Supraphon SU 4172-2
  - Works:
    - Smetana: String Quartet No. 1 in E Minor, "From My Life"
    - Smetana: String Quartet No. 2 in D Minor.
