= Verlobung im Traum =

1933 opera by Hans Krása

Verlobung im Traum (Betrothal in a Dream) (1928–30) is a German-language opera in two acts by Czech composer Hans Krása with a libretto by Rudolf Fuchs and Rudolf Thomas after the novel Uncle's Dream by Fyodor Dostoevsky.

== Performance history ==
The opera was premiered on 18 May 1933 at the Neues deutsches Theater in Prague under George Szell. Later that year, the work was awarded the Czechoslovak State Prize.

== Synopsis ==
The action takes place in Mordasovo, a small Russian town, around 1850.

Prologue

The archivist of Mordasovo relates how the writer Feodor Dostoevsky recently paid a visit to the town, researching the life of a certain Zina—a beautiful girl who once lived there—for a forthcoming novel.

=== Act 1 ===
Zina is in love with Fedya, a political revolutionary on the run from the authorities. Her overbearing mother, Maria Alexandrowna, learns that an aging Prince is visiting the town and sees an opportunity to marry her daughter off. She argues that Zina, by inheriting the old man's wealth, could afford proper care for the gravely ill Fedya. Paul, an old family friend who is also in love with Zina, takes every chance to disparage Fedya in her eyes.

When the Prince arrives, Maria flatters and courts him, praising Zina’s beauty and talent. Against her better judgment, Zina performs Bellini’s Casta diva for the Prince, who is captivated. Maria’s sister-in-law, Nastassja—sympathetic to the Prince—is appalled by the deceit behind the scheme. A letter arrives from Fedya, begging Zina to visit him as he feels near death, but it is intercepted and destroyed by Paul. He and Nastassja vow to sabotage Maria’s plan.

=== Act 2 ===
The Prince awakes from his afternoon siesta. He vaguely remembers proposing to a young woman earlier in the day, but Paul convinces him that it must have been a dream. The Prince, admitting to confusion, decides to leave town with Paul the following day. He goes to bid farewell to Maria and Zina, only to find the house filled with women—guests invited by Nastassja to witness the wedding ceremony.

Embarrassed, the Prince confesses that he dreamt of proposing to Zina. Maria, furious, insists it was no dream. At last, Zina snaps: she tells the Prince he had been tricked into proposing, that her true love is Fedya, and she had agreed to the scheme only for the sake of money. The Prince, moved by her honesty, forgives her. As he departs, he gently asks Zina to forgive his presumption in believing she might want to marry him.

Zina, now free, is overjoyed at the thought of being with Fedya—until a servant arrives with tragic news: Fedya has died.

Epilogue

The archivist explains that shortly after these events, Zina and her mother left Mordasovo. Zina eventually entered a loveless marriage with a local official. Though her beauty remains, life and love have lost all meaning for her.

== Recordings ==
- Jane Henschel, Juanita Lascarro, Charlotte Hellekant, Albert Dohnen, Robert Wörle, Michael Kraus, Ernst Senff Chor, Deutsches Symphonie-Orchester Berlin, Lothar Zagrosek. Decca 'Entartete Musik' series, 1998.
