= Luosha Fang =

American violinist

Luosha Fang 方萝莎
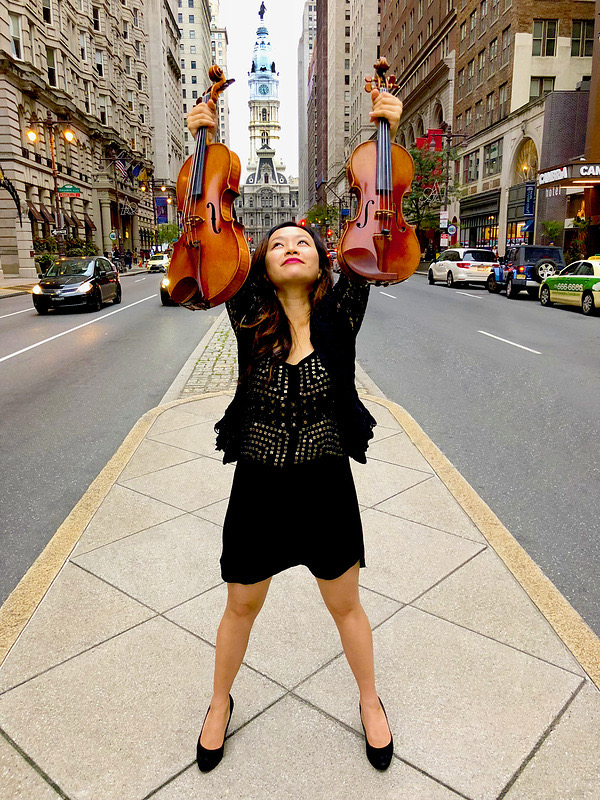

Background information
- Born: Shanghai, China
- Genres: classical
- Occupation: Musician
- Instruments: Violin and Viola
- Website: www.luoshafang.com

Luosha Fang (Chinese: 方萝莎) is an American-Chinese violinist and violist based in NYC and a violin instructor at Bard College.

Fang studied at the Curtis Institute of Music with Ida Kavafian and Shmuel Ashkenasi and at the Escuela Superior de Música Reina Sofía in Madrid as a viola student of Nobuko Imai. She won first prize in the 2019 Classic Strings International Competition in Vienna and the 2018 Tokyo International Viola Competition, and has collaborated with numerous composers, such as American composer Michael Djupstrom as well as with the Almanac Dance Circus Theatre and the Bill T. Jones/Arnie Zane Dance Company. She was formerly the violist in the Pavel Haas Quartet.

She plays the 'Josefowitz' 1690 Andrea Guarneri viola.

== Discography ==
For Cine Sessions

- Cine Sessions: Luosha Fang & Jacob Kellermann (Cine Live Recordings, 2026)

With Albany Symphony Orchestra

- Unforgettable: the music of Tsontakis (Naxos, 8.559826, 2017)

With Pavel Haas Quartet

- Brahms Piano Quintet In F Minor, Op. 34 - String Quintet In G Major, Op. 111 (Supraphon, SU 4306-2, 2022)
