= Tokyo International Viola Competition =

The Tokyo International Viola Competition is a viola competition established in 2009. It is the first Asian competition dedicated exclusively to the viola and is held in conjunction with Viola Space, a three-year violin festival founded in 1992 by Nobuko Imai.

In addition to the financial recognition for the three winners, several special prizes are awarded, including instruments and strings donated for the event, prize for the public vote, prize for the best interpretation of a Japanese composition and invitations to play at various international festivals.

== Winners ==
| Edition | Year | 1st Prize | 2nd Prize | 3rd Prize | Note |
|---|---|---|---|---|---|
| 1 | 2009 | (Russia) Sergey Malov | (Belgium) Dimitri Murrath | (Germany) Veit Bebedikt Hertenstein | |
| 2 | 2012 | (China) Wenting Kang | (Germany) Barbara Buntrock | (Japan) Kimi Makino | |
| 3 | 2015 | (Switzerland) Andrea Burger | (Japan) Kei Tojo | (France) Louise Desjardins | |
| 4 | 2018 | (United States) Luosha Fang | (South Korea) Sejune Kim | (China) Ziyu Shen | |
