= Joža Karas =

Polish-born Czech musician, educator and music historian (1926–2008)

- Born: Josef Karas; May 3, 1926; Warsaw, Poland
- Died: November 28, 2008 (aged 82); Bloomfield, Connecticut, U.S.
- Occupation(s): Musician, teacher

Josef "Joža" Karas (May 3, 1926 – November 28, 2008) was a Polish-born Czech-American musician and teacher who located and made public music composed by inmates who worked at the Nazi concentration camp Theresienstadt during World War II. He was the author of Music in Terezín 1941-1945 (1985).

== Biography ==
Born May 3, 1926, in Warsaw, to Christian parents, Karas emigrated to the United States in 1948 via Colombia and Canada. A violinist and music historian by vocation, he taught at the Hartt School of Music for more than 50 years. He also performed with the Hartford Symphony Orchestra until his retirement in 2006. He spent years searching for the World War II era musical compositions made by Jews in the Nazi concentration camps.

In 1970, he read that some musical compositions and fragments had been found at the Terezin concentration camp and been donated to Prague's Jewish State Museum, including a version of Hans Krasa's children's opera, Brundibar, which was performed at Terezin many times between September 1943 and October 1944. Along with his string quartet friend classical music radio host Ivor Hugh, he created a television special about this music that ABC broadcast in 1970. He conducted the North American premiere of Brundibar in Czech in 1975 and the English language premiere in 1977 after he and his first wife, the former Milada Javora (died 1974), translated the opera into English. In 1993, Channel Classics recorded his version as part of its Composers From Theresienstadt series.

Joža Karas died in Bloomfield, Connecticut, on November 28, 2008, aged 82.
