= Danjulo Ishizaka =

German musician

- Born: 14 May 1979; Bonn, Germany
- Other name: 石坂 団十郎
- Occupation: Cellist

Danjulo Ishizaka (born 14 May 1979) is a German cellist and professor at the Berlin University of Arts and City of Basel Music Academy

== Life ==
Ishizaka, born in Bonn, Germany, is the son of the German piano teacher Ruth Nathrath and Japanese immigrant Junkichi Ishizaka. His sister is the pianist Kimiko Douglass-Ishizaka. He began taking cello lessons at the age of 4. He was a student of Boris Pergamenschikow in Berlin from 1998 until Pergamenschikow's death in 2004, at which point he completed his studies with Tabea Zimmermann.

== Work ==
Ishizaka has been a soloist with many orchestras, including the NHK Symphony Orchestra, the London Philharmonic Orchestra, all 5 BBC Orchestras, the Orchestre de l'Opéra national de Paris, the Mariinsky Theatre Orchestra, the Bavarian Radio Symphony Orchestra under directors including Gerd Albrecht, Andrew Davis, Christoph Eschenbach, Lawrence Foster, Michail and Vladimir Jurowski, Sir Roger Norrington, Mstislav Rostropovich and Leonard Slatkin. He has further performed with artists including Gidon Kremer, Lisa Batiashvili, Viviane Hagner, Tabea Zimmermann, Julia Fischer, Baiba Skride, Antje Weithaas, Veronika Eberle, Martin Helmchen and Ray Chen. His international debut took place with the Vienna Symphony in the Wiener Musikverein under direction of Krzysztof Penderecki. The cellist Rostropovich described Danjulo Ishizaka's artistry with the words: "phenomenal in his technical abilities, perfect in his power of interpretation."

From 2004 to 2013, Ishizaka played the Stradivarius "Lord Aylesford", previously played by Janos Starker, and later played the De Munck-Feuermann (1730). Both celli were provided to him by the Nippon Music Foundation. Ishizaka also plays the Schnabl "Pergamenschikow" cello, provided to him by the Kronberg Academy.

== Awards ==
- 1st prize at the international "Gaspar Cassado-Competition", 1998 in Spain
- 1st prize at the Internationalen Lutoslawski Competition 1999 in Warsaw
- 1st prize at the ARD International Music Competition 2001
- 1st prize at the Grand Prix Emanuel Feuermann of the Kronberg Academy and the Universität der Künste Berlin 2002

In 2006 his debut CD recording was released by Sony, and received the Echo Klassik of the German Phono Academy. In 2007–2008, Ishizaka was chosen for the BBC Radio 3 New Generation Artists scheme. In 2012 he was awarded the Hideo Saito Memorial Fund Award, one of the most prestiged music awards in Japan, given by the Sony Music Foundation in Tokyo.

Ishizaka's 2013 collaboration with the Pavel Haas Quartet was awarded a Gramophone Award for the Chamber category in 2014. "In the Quintet they have the perfect partner in cellist Danjulo Ishizaka – and there’s no sense of a quartet plus one"

== Discography ==
Mendelssohn, Britten, Franck: Cello Sonatas (Danjulo Ishizaka, Cello; Martin Helmchen, Piano)

- Released: 2005
- Format: CD
- Label: Sony Classical (Sony Music)

Schubert: String Quartet No. 14 in D minor, "Death and the Maiden", String Quintet in C Major (Pavel Haas Quartet with Danjulo Ishizaka)

- Released: 2013
- Format: CD
- Label: Supraphon

Grieg, Janácek, Kodály (Danjulo Ishizaka, Cello; Shai Wosner, Piano)

- Released: 2014
- Format: CD
- Label: Onyx
- Producer: Christoph Franke

== Reviews ==
"The only area in which there seems to be no contrast or conflict is over his prodigious technique, and to hear him live is to appreciate not only how free of any technical boundaries he is but also how that has translated into his performances as a disarming lack of egotism."

"Ishizaka is simply sensational in Kodály’s Solo Sonata. He proves masterly in creating cogency with what can often seem quite rhapsodic material."

"Ishizaka also gives us a cogent, virtuoso reading of Kodály's magnificent, soulful Solo Cello Sonata. This is a terrifying piece to play, a work which, in Ishizaka's words, “demolishes the limits of what was thought technically possible on the cello at the time.” The last movement's pyrotechnics are dazzling, but the sonata's sparer, haunted passages are equally effective – the slow movement's dark opening is marvellous in Ishizaka's hands. A superb recital."

== Sources ==
- Official website
- Nippon Music Foundation Stradivarius
