= Ela Stein-Weissberger =

Czech Holocaust survivor (1930–2018)

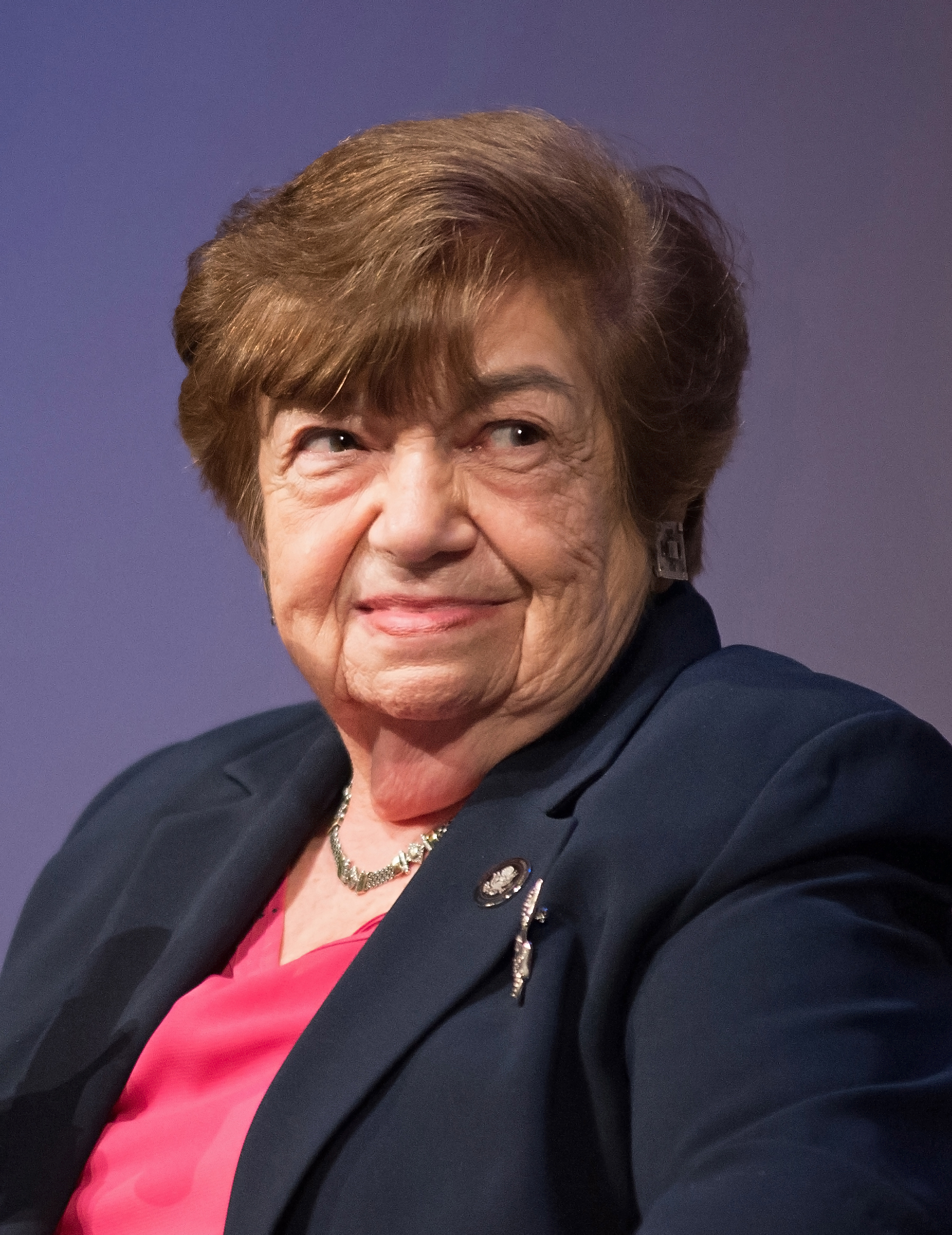
- Born: 30 June 1930; Czechoslovakia
- Died: 30 March 2018 (aged 87); Tappan, New York, United States
- Occupations: spy; intelligence officer; graphic designer; interior designer

Ela Stein-Weissberger (30 June 1930 – 30 March 2018) was a Czech Holocaust survivor who became well known for her roles as a contemporary witness and intelligence officer for the Israel Defense Forces. In her later years she traveled the world discussing her time in concentration camps during World War II. She even wrote about her experiences in a book titled The Cat with the Yellow Star: Coming of Age in Terezin.

Stein-Weissberger was deported to Theresienstadt Ghetto when she was 11 with her mother, grandmother, uncle and sister. While there she played the role of the cat in Brundibár, a children's opera, inside the camp. She was featured in the Nazi Propaganda film Theresienstadt. She, her mother, and sister were released from the camp after Nazi Germany fell to the Allies. Her grandmother and uncle died while at the camp.

After being liberated they moved to Prague Stein-Weissberger stayed for a short period of time before moving to Israel and settling near Tel Aviv. Where she lived and worked for several years as a member of the Israeli Army. She gave birth to a daughter and in 1959 the family moved to the United States. She worked as a graphic and interior designer in New York for most of the 1970s and 80s before beginning to travel the U.S. and telling her experiences from the war.

== See also ==
- List of Holocaust survivors
- List of victims of Nazism

== Bibliography ==
- The Cat with the Yellow Star: Coming of Age in Terezin (ISBN 978-0-8234-1831-2)
