= String Quartet No. 2 (Haas) =

Pavel Haas composed his second string quartet, Op. 7, titled "From the Monkey Mountains" (Czech: "Z opičích hor"), in 1925, three years after he finished his composition studies in Leoš Janáček´s masterclass.

== Background ==
The title of the quartet is somewhat provocative: in Czech, the "Monkey Mountains" used to be the nickname of the Vysočina Region (Moravian Highlands), an area once popular with tourists. The work was premièred in Brno on 16 March 1926, by the Moravian Quartet. The first performance was not well received, however: in the last movement, Haas added a percussionist, in combination with other unusual musical elements, and this daring experiment was not appreciated by the audience. Haas subsequently removed the percussion, though several modern performances and recordings have reinstated it.

== Structure ==
The composition consists of four movements:

1. Landscape (Krajina) - Andante
2. Coach, Coachman and Horse (Kočár, kočí a kůň) - Andante
3. The Moon and I... (Měsíc a já...) - Largo e misterioso
4. Wild Night (Divá noc) - Vivace e con fuoco

The titles of the four movements give the impression of a series of atmospheric scenes from a summer recreation. The first part opens in a calm atmosphere, and gradually develops into a monumental movement with a rich onomatopoeic structure. The opening theme and tempo of the second movement are closely related to that of the first one, evoking the coach, coachman and horse of the title. The third part, "Moon and I..." is the most personal movement of the composition, with a festive climax followed by a return to the atmosphere and material of the opening movement. The closing movement uses folk melodies mixed with jazz elements and with unusual application of the percussion instruments.

The approximate duration of the work is 32 minutes.
