= Pavel Haas =

Moravian-Jewish composer

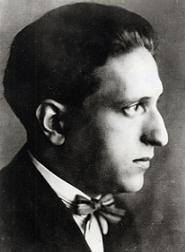
- Born: 21 June 1899; Brno, Austria-Hungary
- Died: 17 October 1944 (aged 45); Auschwitz-Birkenau, German-occupied Poland
- Occupation: Composer

Pavel Haas (21 June 1899 – 17 October 1944) was a Czech composer who was murdered during the Holocaust. He was an exponent of Leoš Janáček's school of composition, and also utilized elements of folk music and jazz. Although his output was not large, he is notable particularly for his song cycles and string quartets.

== Pre-war ==
Haas was born in Brno, into a Moravian-Jewish family. His father, Zikmund, a shoemaker by trade, was from the Moravian region, while his mother, Olga (née Epstein), was born in Odesa. His brother, Hugo Haas (1901–1968), was a popular actor in interwar Czechoslovakia. After studying piano privately, Haas began his more formal musical education at the age of 14 and studied composition at the Brno Conservatory from 1919 to 1921 under Jan Kunc and Vilém Petrželka. This was followed by two years of study in the master class of the noted Czech composer Leoš Janáček. Janáček was by far Haas's most influential teacher, and Haas, in turn, proved to be Janáček's best student. In 1935, he married Soňa Jakobson, the former wife of Russian linguist Roman Jakobson.

Of the more than 50 works Haas wrote during the rest of his life, only 18 were given opus numbers by the self-critical composer. While still working in his father's business, he wrote musical works of all kinds, including symphonic and choral works, lieder, chamber music, and scores for cinema and theatre. His opera, Šarlatán (The Charlatan), was first performed in Brno to sincere acclaim in April 1938. He received the Smetana Foundation award for the opera (sharing the award with Vítězslava Kaprálová who received it for her Military Sinfonietta).

== The war ==
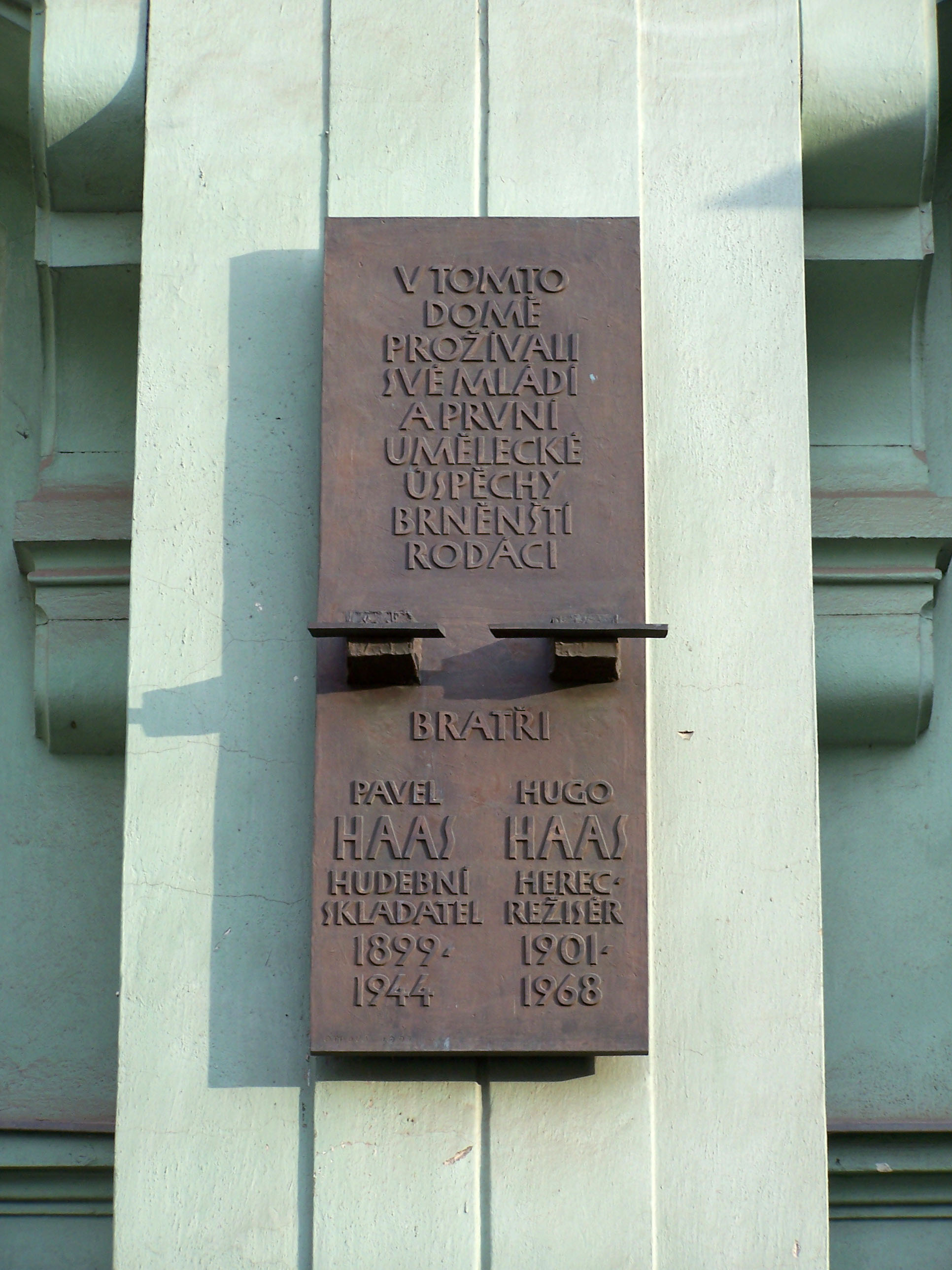
Memorial plaque to Pavel and Hugo Haas at the house where they grew up in Brno

In 1941, Haas was deported to the Theresienstadt concentration camp (Terezín). He was one of several Moravian-Jewish composers there, including Viktor Ullmann, Gideon Klein and Hans Krása. Prior to his arrest, he had officially divorced his wife Soňa in order that she and their young daughter, Olga, would not suffer a similar fate. In 1938, in desperation, he wrote to relatives of his wife in New Jersey, and also to Frank Rybka in New York, who was a former student of Janáček. An attempt was launched by these Americans to help Haas secure passage, but this came too late to help. On his arrival at Theresienstadt, he became very depressed and had to be coaxed into composition by Gideon Klein. Haas wrote at least eight compositions in the camp, only a few of which have survived. They include a set of Four Songs on Chinese Poetry for baritone and piano, a work for men's choir titled "Al s'fod" (his first and only work in Hebrew), and the Study for String Orchestra which was premiered in Theresienstadt under the Czech conductor Karel Ančerl and is probably Haas's best-known work today. The orchestral parts were found by Ančerl after the liberation of Theresienstadt and the score was reconstructed.

In 1944 the Nazis remodeled Theresienstadt just before a visit from the Red Cross, and a propaganda film, Der Führer schenkt den Juden eine Stadt (The Führer Gives the Jews a City), was made by director Kurt Gerron, under the coercion of the camp commandant, Karl Rahm. In the film, Theresienstadt, children are seen singing Hans Krása's opera, Brundibár, and Haas can be seen taking a bow after a performance, conducted by Karel Ančerl, of his Study for Strings. When the propaganda project was over, the Nazis transferred 18,000 prisoners, including Haas and the children who had sung in Brundibár, to Auschwitz-Birkenau, where they were murdered in the gas chambers. According to the testimony of Karel Ančerl, Haas stood next to him after their arrival at Auschwitz. Doctor Mengele was about to send Ančerl to the gas chamber first, but the weakened Haas began to cough, so the death sentence was chosen for him instead. After the war Ančerl met with Haas's brother Hugo and told him the story.

== Post-war ==
Haas's large-scale symphony, which he began prior to his deportation to Theresienstadt, remained unfinished, but the extant material was orchestrated by Zdeněk Zouhar in 1994. Haas's music, stemming from Bohemian and Moravian roots, is sometimes tinted by Hebrew melody. Haas has been described as "a reserved but eloquent student of Janáček" by Alex Ross in his history of classical music in the 20th century, The Rest is Noise: Listening to the Twentieth Century.

== Works ==
Principal publishers: Boosey & Hawkes, Bote & Bock, Sádlo, Tempo

Genre	Opus	Date composed	Czech title	English title	Scoring	Notes
Vocal	1	1918–1919	Šest písní v lidovém tónu	6 Songs in Folk Tone	for soprano and piano	orchestrated 1938
Vocal	2	1919–1920	Tři písně	3 Songs	for soprano and piano	words by Josef Svatopluk Machar
Chamber music	3	1920	Smyčcový kvartet č. 1	String Quartet No. 1 in C♯ minor	for 2 violins, viola and cello	
Vocal	4	1919	Čínské písně	Chinese Songs	for medium voice and piano	words by Kao Shi, Tsui Hao, Thu Fu
Orchestral	5	1921	Zesmutnělé scherzo	Scherzo triste	for orchestra	
Vocal	6	1923	"Fata morgana" Klavírní kvintet se sólovým zpěvákem tenorového hlasu	Fata morgana	for tenor, 2 violins, viola, cello and piano	words by Rabindranath Tagore
Chamber music	7	1925	Smyčcový kvartet č. 2 "Z opičích hor"	String Quartet No. 2 From the Monkey Mountains	for 2 violins, viola, cello and percussion 'ad libitum'	
Vocal	8	1927	Vyvolená	The Chosen One	for tenor, flute, horn, violin and piano	poems by Jiří Wolker
Choral	9	1928–1929	Karneval	Carnival	for male chorus	words by Dalibor Chalupa
Chamber music	10	1929	Dechový kvintet	Wind Quintet	for flute, oboe, clarinet, horn and bassoon	
Orchestral	11	1931	Předehra pro rozhlas	Overture for Radio	for small orchestra and male voices	words by Hugo Haas
Choral	12	1932	Žalm 29	Psalm XXIX	for baritone, female chorus and chamber orchestra with organ	
Film score	–	1933	Život je pes	Life Is a Dog	for orchestra	music for the film
Film score	–	1934	Mazlíček	The Little Pet	for orchestra	music for the film
Piano	13	1935	Suita pro klavír	Suite	for piano	
Opera	14	1936	Šarlatán	The Charlatan	for soloists, chorus and orchestra	opera in 3 acts; libretto by the composer
Film score	–	1937	Kvočna	Mother-Hen	for orchestra	music for the film
Piano	–	1937	Allegro moderato	Allegro moderato	for piano	
Chamber music	15	1937–1938	Smyčcový kvartet č. 3	String Quartet No. 3	for 2 violins, viola and cello	
Choral	16	1938	Od večera do rána muzika nám vyhrává...	From Evening Until Morning Music Plays For Us...	for soloists, chorus and orchestra	Medley of songs from the Moravian Slovakia region
Chamber music	17	1939	Suita pro hoboj a klavír	Suite	for oboe and piano	
Vocal	18	1940	Sedm písní v lidovém tónu	7 Songs in Folk Style	for high voice and piano	words by František Čelakovský
Orchestral	–	1940–1941	Symfonie	Symphony	for orchestra	unfinished; orchestration completed by Zdeněk Zouhar
Choral	–	1942	Al s'fod	Do Not Lament	for male chorus	words by David Shimoni
Orchestral	–	1943	Studie pro smyčcový orchestr	Study	for string orchestra	
Vocal	–	1944	Čtyři písně na slova čínské poezie: 1. Zaslech jsem divoké husy 2. V bambusovém háji 3. Daleko měsíc je domova 4. Probděná noc	4 Songs on Chinese Poetry: 1. I Heard the Wild Geese; 2. In the Bamboo Grove; 3. The Moon Is Far from Home; 4. A Sleepless Night	for bass (or baritone) and piano	poems by Wei Jing-wu, Wang-wei, Tchang Tiou-ling, Han I
Vocal	–			The Advent	for mezzo-soprano, tenor and quintet	
	–			Fantasy on a Jewish Melody		
Piano	–			Partita in Olden Style	for piano	lost
Vocal	–			Terezín Songs		
Vocal	–		Tři skladby	3 Pieces	for mezzo-soprano, tenor, flute, clarinet, 2 violins, viola and cello	lost
Concertante	–		Variace pro klavír a smyčcový orchestr	Variations	for piano and string orchestra	

== Recordings ==
- Šarlatán (complete opera) – Prague Philharmonic Choir, Prague State Opera Orchestra, Israel Yinon (conductor); Decca Record Company 460 042-2 (1998)
- Pavel Haas: Orchestral Music – Staatsphilharmonie Brünn, Israel Yinon (conductor); Koch Schwann (1996)

Scherzo triste, Op. 5
Charlatan (opera suite), Op. 14
Symphonie (unfinished; orchestration Zdeněk Zouhar)

- Janáček/Haas/Szymanowski: String Quartets Arranged for String Orchestra – Australian Chamber Orchestra, Richard Tognetti (conductor); Chandos CD 10016

String Quartet No. 2 "Z opičích hor", Op. 7

- Pavel Haas: String Quartets 1-3 (Czech Degenerate Music, Volume 2) – Kocian Quartet; Praga Productions 250 118 (1998)
- Haas and Janáček String Quartets – Pavel Haas Quartet, Supraphon SU 3922-2

String Quartet No. 1 in C-sharp minor, Op. 3
String Quartet No. 3, Op. 15

- Haas/Korngold/Haydn string quartets: String quartet No. 2. Adamas Quartett; Gramola 2013.
- Pavel Haas: Bläserquintett, Suiten Op. 13 • Op. 17, Vyvolená – Jörg Dürmüller (tenor), Dennis Russell Davies (piano), Stuttgarter Bläserquintet; Orfeo International Music C 386 961 A (1996)

Wind Quintet, Op. 10
Suite for Piano, Op. 13
Suite for Oboe and Piano, Op. 17
Vyvolená, Op. 8

- Chamber Music of Pavel Haas – Ensemble Villa Musica; MD&G 304 1524-2

Wind Quintet, Op. 10
Suite for Oboe and Piano, Op. 17
String Quartet No. 3, Op. 15

- Risonanza – Vilém Veverka (oboe), Ivo Kahánek (piano); Supraphon SU 3993-2

Suite for Oboe and Piano

- Music from Theresienstadt – Wolfgang Holzmair (baritone), Russell Ryan (piano); Bridge Records 9280

4 Songs after Words of Chinese Poetry

- 4 Songs on Chinese Poetry, sung by Christian Gerhaher, appear on a CD Terezín/Theresienstadt initiated by Anne Sofie von Otter, Deutsche Grammophon, 2007.
- KZ Musik: Encyclopedia of Music Composed in Concentration Camps, Volume 4 – Petr Matsuszek (baritone), Francesco Lotoro (piano); KZ Music 231787

Four Chinese Songs

The whole music written in Concentration Camps (including P. Haas's Study for Orchestra, 4 Chinese Songs and Al s'fod) are contained in the CD-Encyclopedia KZ MUSIK created by Francesco Lotoro (Musikstrasse Roma- Membran Hamburg), 2007

- The Bohemian Album - Dvořák, Haas, Schulhoff – Amsterdam Sinfonietta, Candida Thompson; Channel Classics 24409, 2009.

String Quartet No. 2 "Z opičích hor", Op. 7

== Haas in literature ==
Haas is a central character in David Herter's First Republic trilogy, comprising the novels On the Overgrown Path, The Luminous Depths and One Who Disappeared.

Haas is mentioned in Simon Mawer's The Glass Room.

== Sources ==
- Sadie, S. (ed.) (1980) The New Grove Dictionary of Music & Musicians, [vol. # 8].
- Ross, A. (2007) The Rest is Noise: Listening to the Twentieth Century (Farrar, Straus and Giroux, New York
- Matějková, J. Hugo Haas. Život je pes Prague: Nakladatelství XYZ, 2005. ISBN 80-86864-18-9
