= Sergey Malov (musician) =

Sergey Malov Сергей Олегович Малов
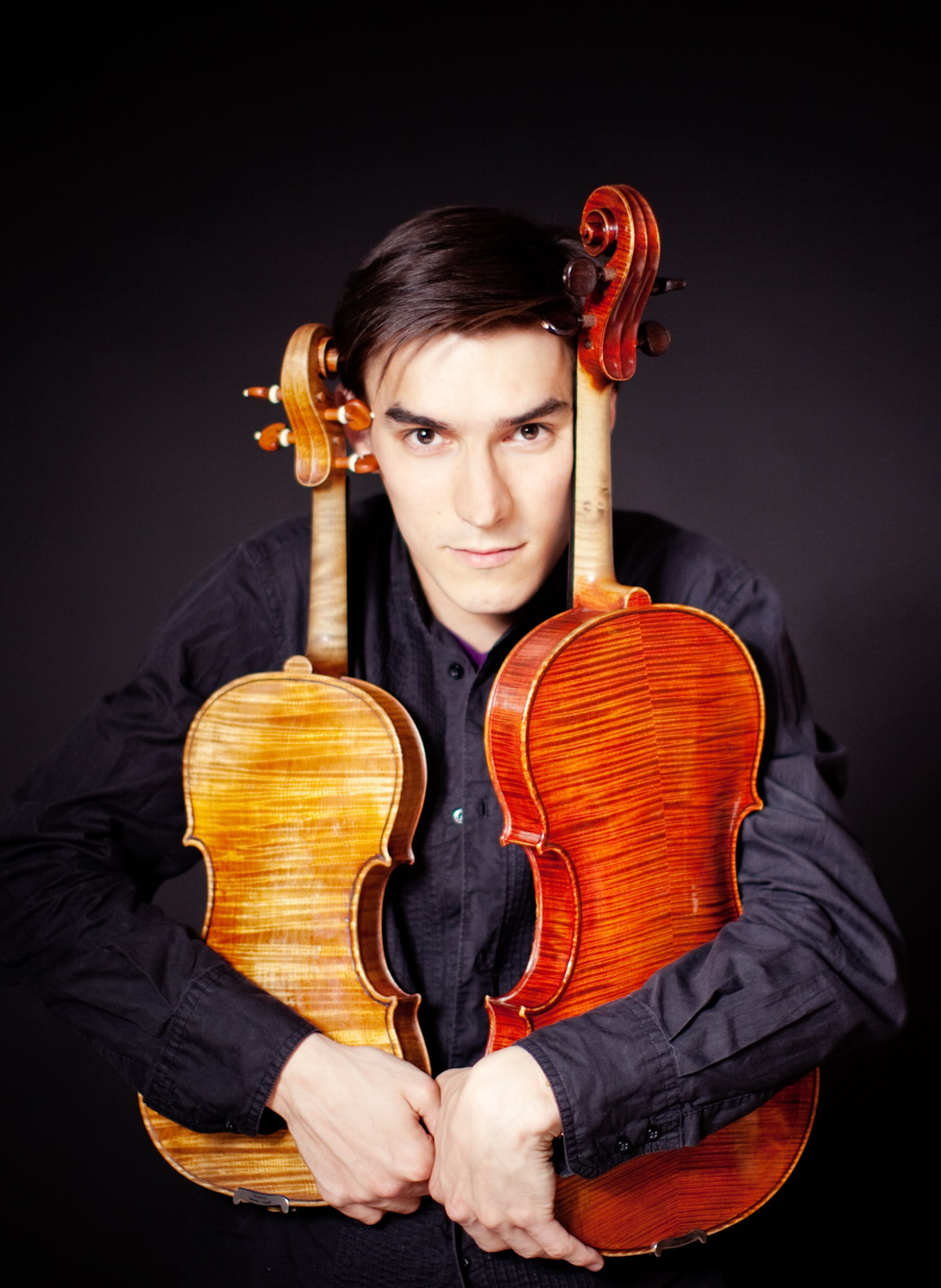

Background information
- Born: 18 June 1983 (age 43); Leningrad, Soviet Union
- Genres: classical music
- Occupations: violinist, violist
- Years active: 2002–present
- Website: sergeymalov.com

Sergey Olegovich Malov (Russian: Сергей Олегович Малов; born 18 June 1983 in Leningrad, Soviet Union) is a Russian/Hungarian violinist and violist.

== Life ==
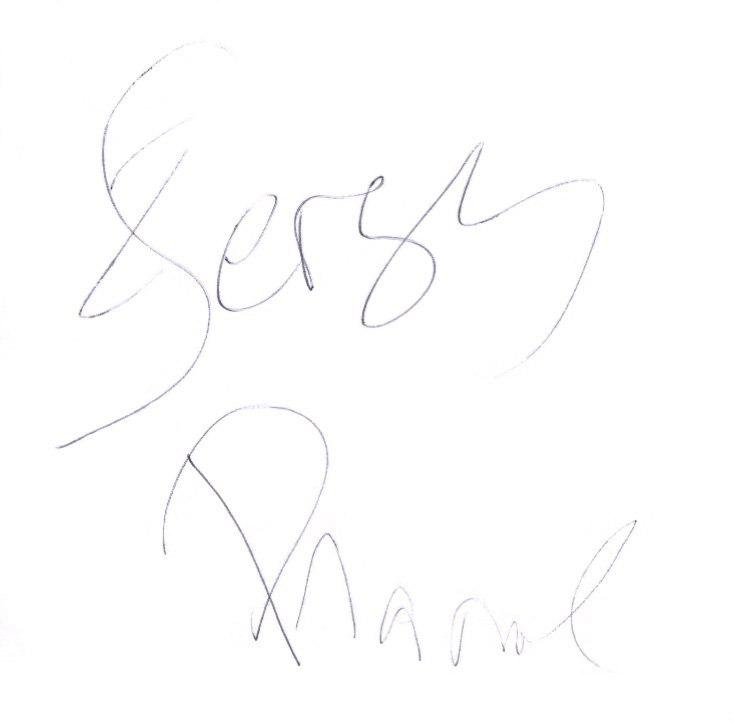
Sergey Malov's autograph

Malov was born in Leningrad (now Saint-Petersburg) in 1983. His father Oleg Malov is a pianist and professor at the Saint Petersburg Conservatory. His mother Klara Lyudvigovna Malova is a music teacher.

Malov's first teacher was Tatiana Liberova (Saint Petersburg).

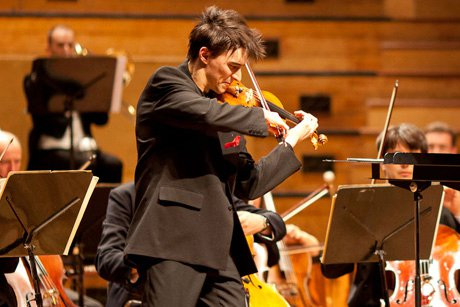
Malov's performance at Michael Hill International Violin Competition in New Zealand (2011)

Malov is a winner of international violinist and violist competitions. He plays violoncello da spalla. He speaks six languages: Russian, German, English, French, Spanish and Hungarian. He enjoys sports, plays soccer, practices martial arts.

== Concerts ==
Malov has performed with such orchestras as:

- Bavarian Radio Symphony Orchestra
- London Philharmonic Orchestra
- Camerata Salzburg
- Saint Petersburg Academic Symphony Orchestra
- Moscow Philharmonic Orchestra
- Stavanger Symphony Orchestra
- and others.

== Honours and awards ==
Malov was first prize winner of the following competitions:

- Michael Hill International Violin Competition in New Zealand (2011),
- International Mozart Competition in Salzburg (2011),
- Jascha Heifetz Competition in Vilnius (2009),
- Tokyo International Viola Competition (2009),
- and others

== Sources ==
- Бурлина, Е.Я. (2010). "Из Петербурга в Берлин и обратно". Musicus (Музыкальный). Вестник Санкт-Петербургской государственной консерватории им. Н.А. Римского-Корсакова (PDF). Vol. 3–4. pp. 45–47.
- Osiecki, Matthias (2006-12-30). "Sergey Malov, Violine. Von St. Petersburg ans Salzburger Mozarteum" (in German). ORF.
