= Der gewaltige Hahnrei =

Der gewaltige Hahnrei is an opera by German composer Berthold Goldschmidt based on Le Cocu Magnifique by Fernand Crommelynck. The opera was premiered 14 February 1932 at the Nationaltheater Mannheim.

== Recording ==
- Goldschmidt: Der gewaltige Hahnrei - Helen Lawrence (mezzo-soprano), Claudio Otelli (bass), Robert Worle (tenor), Martin Petzold (tenor), Marita Posselt (soprano), Roberta Alexander (soprano), Michael Kraus (tenor) Deutsches Symphonie-Orchester Berlin, conducted Lothar Zagrosek Recorded: 1992–11, Decca 1994
