= Supraphon =

Czech record label

- Supraphon
- Parent company: Sony Music
- Founded: 1932
- Country of origin: Czech Republic
- Location: Prague
- Official website: supraphon.cz

Supraphon 60th Anniversary

Supraphon Music Publishing is a Czech record label, oriented mainly towards publishing classical music and popular music, with an emphasis on Czech and Slovak composers.

== History ==
The Supraphon name was first registered as a trademark in 1932. The name was used for the label of domestic albums produced for export by Ultraphon company. After World War II, Ultraphon was nationalized and its name changed to Gramofonové závody. In 1961, the name was changed to Gramofonové závody – Supraphon and later simplified to Supraphon in 1969.

In Czechoslovakia, Supraphon was one of the three major state-owned labels, the other two being Panton and Opus. By January 2013, Supraphon was the official Czech distributor for the Warner Music Group. The Czech branch of Warner Music revived after the company acquired EMI Czech Republic. Panton is currently a division of Supraphon. Opus, operating in Slovakia, became independent after the break-up of Czechoslovakia and was acquired by Warner Music Group in 2019.

In January 2025, Sony Music Entertainment announced its acquisition of Supraphon.

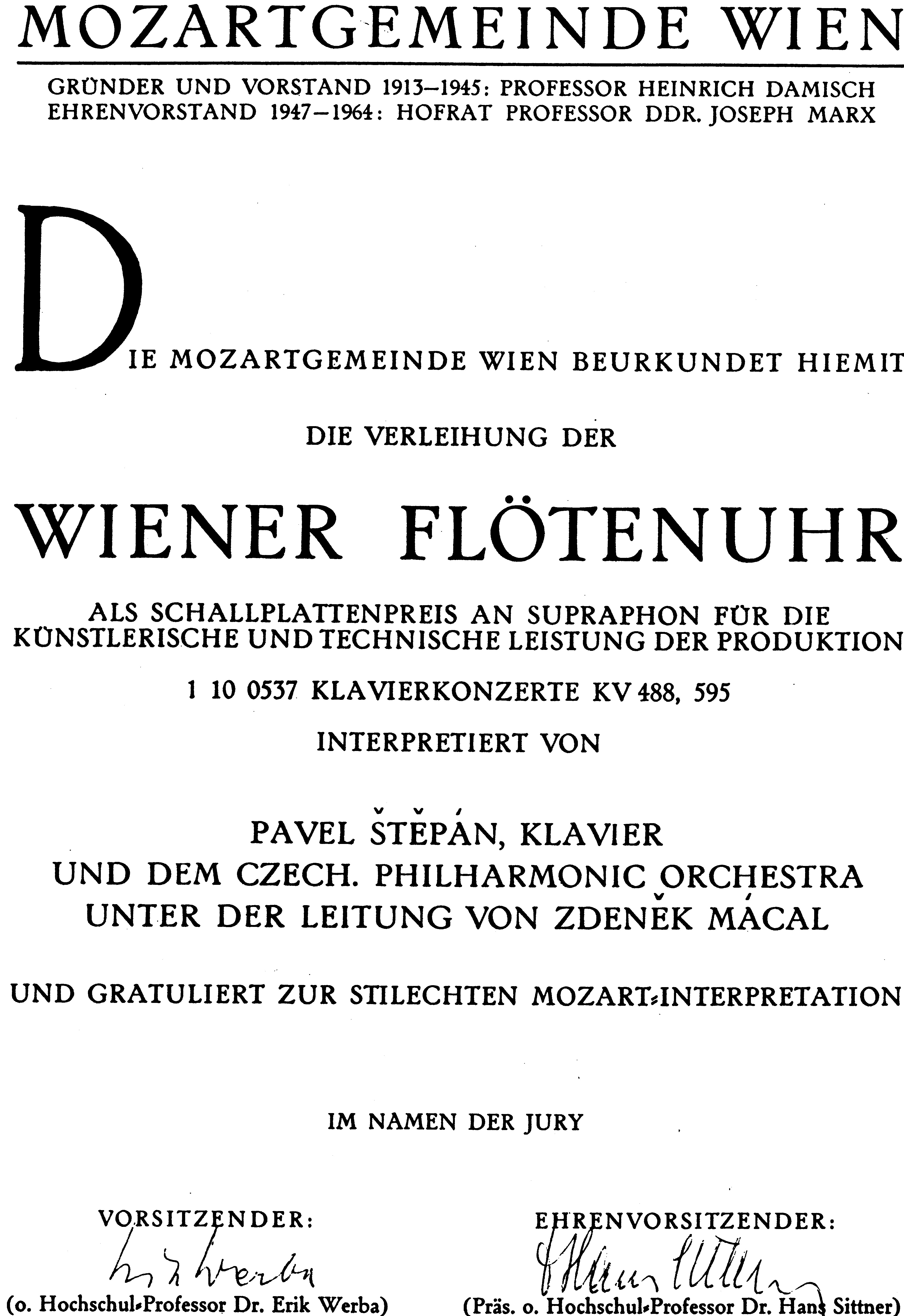
Wiener Flötenuhr 1971

== Catalogues ==
The artistic direction of the firm gave rise to a broad catalogue of titles which systematically mapped out the works of Bedřich Smetana, Antonín Dvořák, Leoš Janáček, Bohuslav Martinů and Jan Dismas Zelenka, as well as other representatives of both the Czech and the international music worlds. Significant domestic and foreign soloists, chamber ensembles, orchestras and conductors all contributed to its collection of recordings.

Supraphon archives contain the recordings of Czech Philharmonic under the baton of Václav Talich, Karel Ančerl, Karel Šejna, Václav Neumann and others, as well as recordings of Saša Večtomov and such non-Czechoslovak artists as Sviatoslav Richter, Emil Gilels, Mstislav Rostropovich, Ida Haendel, Henryk Szeryng, Hélène Boschi or André Gertler. Many recordings have been reissued in editions Archive, Ančerl Gold Edition, Talich Special Edition.

The label also focused on collaboration with the present classical music interpreters, with recordings by the Pavel Haas Quartet awarded BBC Music Magazine's "Chamber Choice". Among other artists working with Supraphon were Jiří Bělohlávek and Sir Charles Mackerras.

The company's first stereo records were issued in 1961, although recordings were in the format from 1958. The label's earliest stereophonic pop music was recorded in 1964.

In the 1970s, Supraphon made some records in four channel stereo using the quadraphonic ('SQ')system. For example: Two-LP-set Bedřich Smetana: Má Vlast. Czech Philharmonic Orchestra, Conductor: Václav Neumann. Supraphon Stereo/Quad 1410 2021/2 P 1976.

Since 1981, Supraphon was recording in digital and first CDs were produced in Japan in 1984. Supraphon started releasing popular music on CDs from 1987.

In 1988, Grammy nominated artists The Moody Brothers recorded an album in Prague with Jiří Brabec and Country Beat. The album Friends was the first such country music cooperative production between an American company, Lamon Records and Supraphon. The recording earned critical acclaim and won the Moodys and Brabec, along with the producers, engineers and studios involved in the project the Ampex Golden Reel Award.

The company has continued producing new recordings in the 21st century, including output by the Collegium Marianum and the Pavel Haas Quartet.

== See also ==
- List of record labels
