= František Domažlický =

Czech composer (1913–1997)

František Domažlický (13 May 1913 – 29 October 1997) was a Czech composer.

He was born František Tausig in Prague. He was sent to Theresienstadt but survived.

== Selected works ==
Orchestral

- Serenade in D for string orchestra, Op. 16 (1954)
- Habanera (1955)
- Suite, Op. 26 (1959–1960)
- Divertimento, Op. 29 (1962)
- Symphony (1962)
- Prskavky (Squibs), Suite for string orchestra, Op. 30 (1963)
- Ouvertura piccola, Op. 42 (1970)
- Suita danza for string orchestra, Op. 52 (1982); also for 4 saxophones and brass quintet, or 2 accordions (or 2 violins) and piano
- Malá taneční suita (Little Dance Suite) for small chamber orchestra, Op. 57 (1965)
- Serenata da camera for string orchestra, Op. 64 (1987)
- Encore, Op. 74 (1991)
- Petriana Overture, arrangement for string orchestra (1993)

Concertante

- Concerto for oboe and string orchestra, Op. 25 (1958)
- Concerto No. 1 for violin and orchestra, Op. 28 (1961)
- Concerto for trombone and orchestra, Op. 35 (1964)
- Concerto for viola and orchestra, Op. 36 (1965–1966)
- Jaro rytíře d'Artagnana (The Spring of the Knight d'Artagnan), Symphonic Picture for cello and orchestra, Op. 40 (1968)
- Concerto for horn and orchestra, Op. 43 (1971)
- Concerto for bassoon and orchestra, Op. 44 (1972)
- Concerto No. 2 for violin and orchestra, Op. 47 (1975)
- Concerto for flute and string orchestra, Op. 48 (1976–1977)
- Concerto for clarinet and string orchestra, Op. 50 (1980–1981)
- Concerto for 2 violins and string orchestra, Op. 51 (1981–1982)
- Concerto rustico for double bass and string orchestra, Op. 55 (1983)
- Concerto for tuba and string orchestra, Op. 53 (1983)
- Concerto for trumpet and orchestra, Op. 60 (1986)
- Concerto for alto saxophone and orchestra, Op. 65 (1988)
- Concertino for bagpipes and orchestra, Op. 76 (1991)

Chamber music

- Píseň beze slov (Song without Words) for string quartet (1942)
- Duet for 2 violins, Op. 2 (1953)
- Duet for 2 clarinets, Op. 3 (1953)
- Romance for clarinet and piano, Op. 8 (1953)
- Šest národních písní (6 Folk Songs) for 2 violins and viola, Op. 13 (1954)
- Wind Quintet No. 1, Op. 23 (1956)
- Tři skladby (3 Pieces) for violin and piano, Op. 24 (1957)
- String Quartet No. 2, Op. 32 (1962–1963)
- Polní kvítí (Wild Flowers), Suite for oboe and harp, Op. 31 (1962)
- Piano Trio, Op. 34 (1963–1964)
- Komorní hudba (Chamber Music) for violin, cello, bass clarinet and guitar, Op. 38 (1966)
- Wind Quintet No. 2, Op. 39 (1967)
- Pět bagatel (5 Bagatelles) for viola and piano, Op. 41 (1969)
- Con moto for violin and piano (1969)
- Sen mládí (Youth Dream) for 3 recorders, 2 violins, cello and piano (1971)
- Koncert pro dechový oktet (Concerto for Wind Octet: 2 oboes, 2 clarinets, 2 horns and 2 bassoons), Op. 45 (1973)
- Sonata for trumpet and piano, Op. 49 (1979)
- Suita danza, version for 2 violins and piano, Op. 52 (1982)
- Duet for 2 tubas, Op. 53a (1983)
- Hudba pro čtyři saxofony (Music for Four Saxophones), Op. 54 (1983)
- Žesťový kvintet (Brass Quintet) for 2 trumpets, horn, trombone and tuba, Op. 56 (1984)
- String Quartet No. 3, Op. 57 (1984)
- Sonata for trombone and piano Op. 58 (1985)
- Trio-Sonata for violin, marimba and guitar, Op. 59 (1985)
- Partita for organ and 5 brass instruments, Op. 66 (1988)
- Flight of a Gull for English horn and piano, Op. 72 (1990)
- Wind Quintet No. 3, Op. 73 (1990)
- Ragtime I, II for wind quintet, Op. 73a (1990)
- Sonatina for tuba and piano, Op. 75 (1991)
- Scherzo for tuba and piano, Op. 77 (1992)
- Hudba pro housle a violu (Music for Violin and Viola), Op.78 (1993)
- Trio for violin, viola and cello, Op. 79 (1994)

Vocal

- Píseň máje (May Song) for male chorus (1942–1943); composed in Terezín
- Sloky lásky (Strophes of Love), Song Cycle on poetry by Stěpan Ščipačov for voice and piano, Op. 14 (1954)
- České písně (Czech Songs) for 3 female voices, or female or children's choir, and string quartet, Op. 17 (1955)
- Písně na slova Jana Pilaře (Songs on words by Jan Pilař) for voice and piano, Op. 21 (1955–1956)
- Písně na slova Aloise Volkmana (Songs on words by Alois Volkman) for voice and piano, Op. 68 (1989–1990)
- Balada o stromu (Ballad of a Tree) for voice and piano or organ, Op. 70 (1990)
- It Will Be Us Ever More, Cycle of male choruses on words by Jaroslav Marek, Op. 71 (1990)

== Recordings ==
- Songs (on Krasa, Brundibar). Channel Classics.
