= Four Orchestral Songs (Krása) =

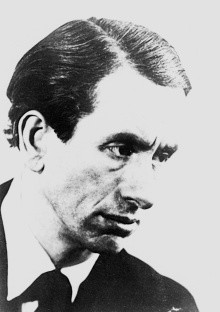
Hans Krása before 1935

The Four Orchestral Songs (Ger: 4 Orchesterlieder), Op. 1, is a musical work for voice and orchestra by Czech composer Hans Krása.

== Composition and performance ==
The work was composed in 1920, setting nonsense verses from the collection Galgenlieder (Eng: Gallows Songs) by Christian Morgenstern. The first performance took place at the Neues Deutsches Theater in Prague in May 1921 with the Czech Philharmonic under the direction of Krása's composition teacher Alexander Zemlinsky. The soloist was baritone Max Klein. The performance caught the attention of the writer and critic Max Brod who from then on took a close interest in Krása's career. The work was subsequently taken into the publishing house of Universal Edition.

== Structure ==
The titles of the four songs are as follows:-

1. Geiß und Schleiche
2. Nein
3. Der Seufzer
4. Galgenbruders Lied an Sophie, die Henkersmaid

The set has a performance duration of approximately 8 minutes.

== Instrumentation ==
The orchestra consists of: two piccolos, two flutes, two oboes, cor anglais, two clarinets, bass clarinet, two bassoons, contrabassoon, four horns, two trumpets, four trombones, tuba, timpani, percussion, harp, celesta, and strings.

== Recordings ==
- Magdalena Kožená/Czech Philharmonic/Sir Simon Rattle - Pentatone PTC 5187077.
