= Gideon Klein =

Czech composer

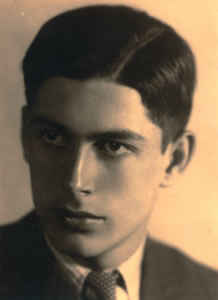
Gideon Klein

Gideon Klein (6 December 1919 – c. January 1945) was a Czech pianist, classical music composer, educator and organizer of cultural life at Theresienstadt concentration camp. Klein was murdered in the Holocaust.

== Life ==
Klein was born into a Moravian Jewish family in Přerov and, showing musical talent early, studied piano with Růžena Kurzová and Vilém Kurz, and composition with Alois Hába (in 1939–1940). He was forced to abort his university studies in 1940 when the Nazis closed all institutions of higher learning following their occupation of Czechoslovakia in March 1939. Since compositions and performances by Jewish musicians were banned, his own works could not be performed, though he managed to perform as a concert pianist under several aliases for a time, e.g., under the pseudonym Karel Vránek. Despite those harsh circumstances Klein managed to continue composing. In 1940 he was offered a scholarship at the Royal Academy of Music in London, but by that time anti-Jewish legislation prevented his emigration.

In December 1941 he was deported by the Nazis to Theresienstadt Ghetto concentration camp, where along with Leoš Janáček's pupil Pavel Haas, Hans Krása, and Schoenberg's pupil Viktor Ullmann he became one of the major composers at that camp. He gave concerts in secret, but the camp became one of the few in which artistic activity was eventually permitted by Nazis on any scale, if only to deceive the broader public as to their real intentions. His works from these years include music for string quartet (similar in tone to Berg's opus 3 work), a string trio, and a piano sonata, among others. Moreover, Klein performed as solo pianist at approximately 15 recitals, and also participated in chamber music performances (as part of a piano trio and a piano quartet).

In October 1944, Klein was deported to Auschwitz and then to Fürstengrube, a coal-mining labour camp less than two weeks after completing his string trio. Klein was murdered under unclear circumstances at age 25 on January 25, 1945, during the liquidation of Fürstengrube, a subcamp of Auschwitz. He had confided his manuscripts to Irma Semecká, his Theresienstadt girlfriend, before leaving, and they were turned over to his sister Eliška at the war's end.

His work was influenced by Alois Hába, Arnold Schoenberg, Alban Berg, and particularly Leoš Janáček. He used melody from Janáček's The Diary of One Who Disappeared as a theme in his Divertimento (1940).

Recordings on Northeastern and on Koch International Classics, for example, have allowed modern listeners to listen to his compositions of the 1940s.

== Selected works ==
- Four Movements for String Quartet (1936–1938), CHF
- Topol (The Poplar Tree), melodrama for narrator and piano (1938)
- Duo for Violin and Viola in the Quarter-Tone System (1940)
- Preludium for Solo Viola (1940)
- Divertimento for Eight Wind Instruments (1940)
- Three Songs for High Voice and Piano, Op. 1 (1940)
  1. The Fountain (Johann Klaj)
  2. In the Midst of Life (Friedrich Hölderlin)
  3. Darkness Descending (Johann Wolfgang Goethe), Czech translations by Erich A. Saudek
- String Quartet, Op. 2 (1941)
- Duo for Violin and Cello (1941; unfinished)
- Male Choruses, arrangements of Czech and Russian folk-songs (1942)
- Bachuri Le'an Tisa (Young Man, Where are you Going?), setting of Hebrew text for 3-part female choir (1942)
- Madrigal for Two Sopranos, Alto, Tenor and Bass to words by François Villon, Czech translation by Otokar Fischer (1942)
- The First Sin, for male voice choir on a Czech folk poem (1942)
- Fantasy and Fugue for String Quartet (1942–1943)
- Wiegenlied, arrangement of a Jewish lullaby, set in Hebrew (1943)
- Piano Sonata (1943), PA 9'
- Madrigal for Two Sopranos, Alto, Tenor and Bass to words by Franz Holderlin, Czech translation by Erich A Saudek (1943)
- Spruch (A Saying) for mixed choir (1944)
- Trio for Violin, Viola and Cello (1944)
- Partita (Trio for Violin, Viola and Cello in arrangement for chamber orchestra by Vojtěch Saudek)

== Remembrance ==
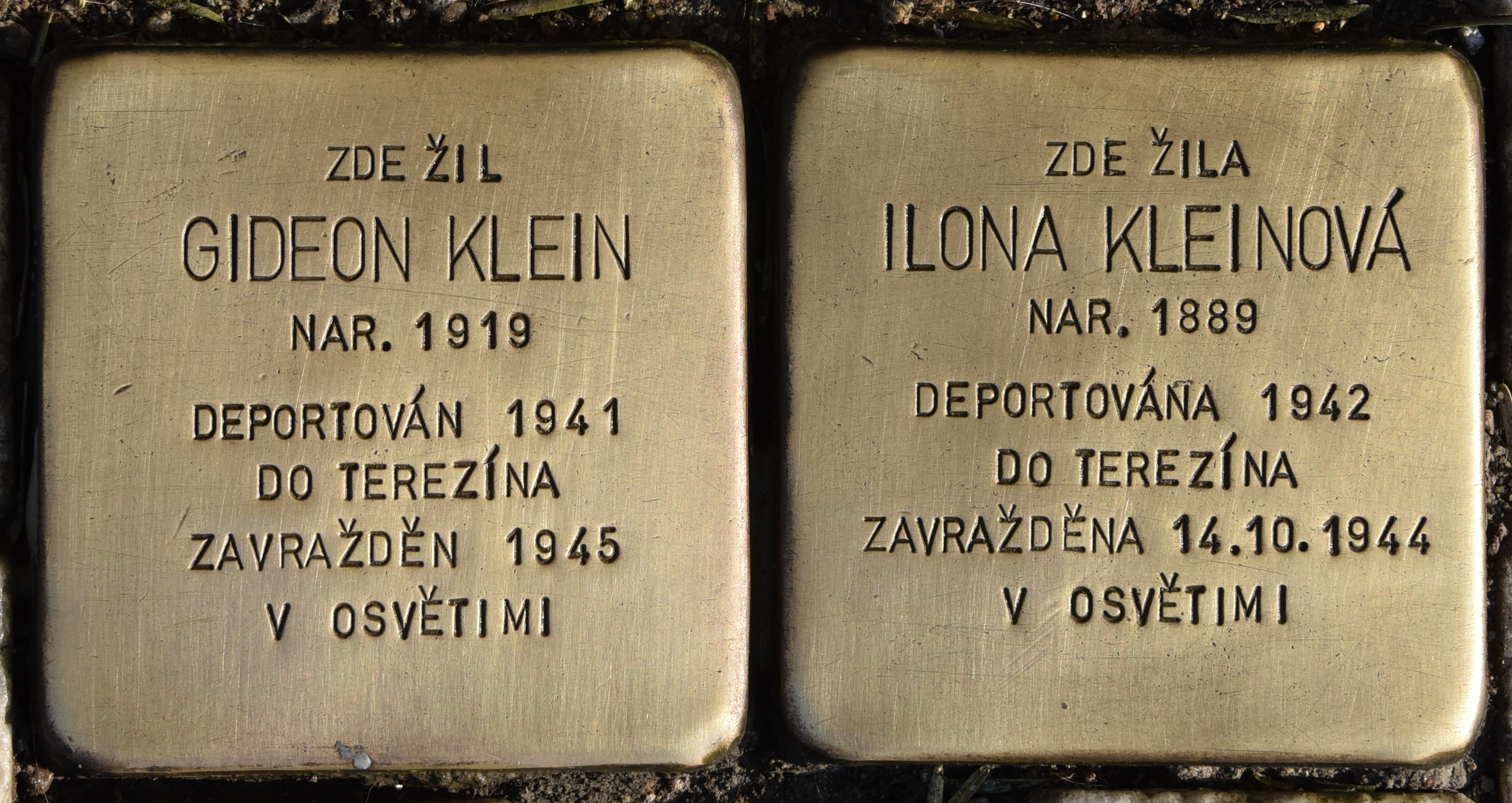
Stolpersteine in Prague-Nové Mӗsto

In Prague, German artist Gunter Demnig collocated two Stolpersteine für Gideon Klein and Ilona Kleinová.

There is a Klein Trio, playing his music.
