= Berthold Goldschmidt =

German Jewish composer (1903–1996)

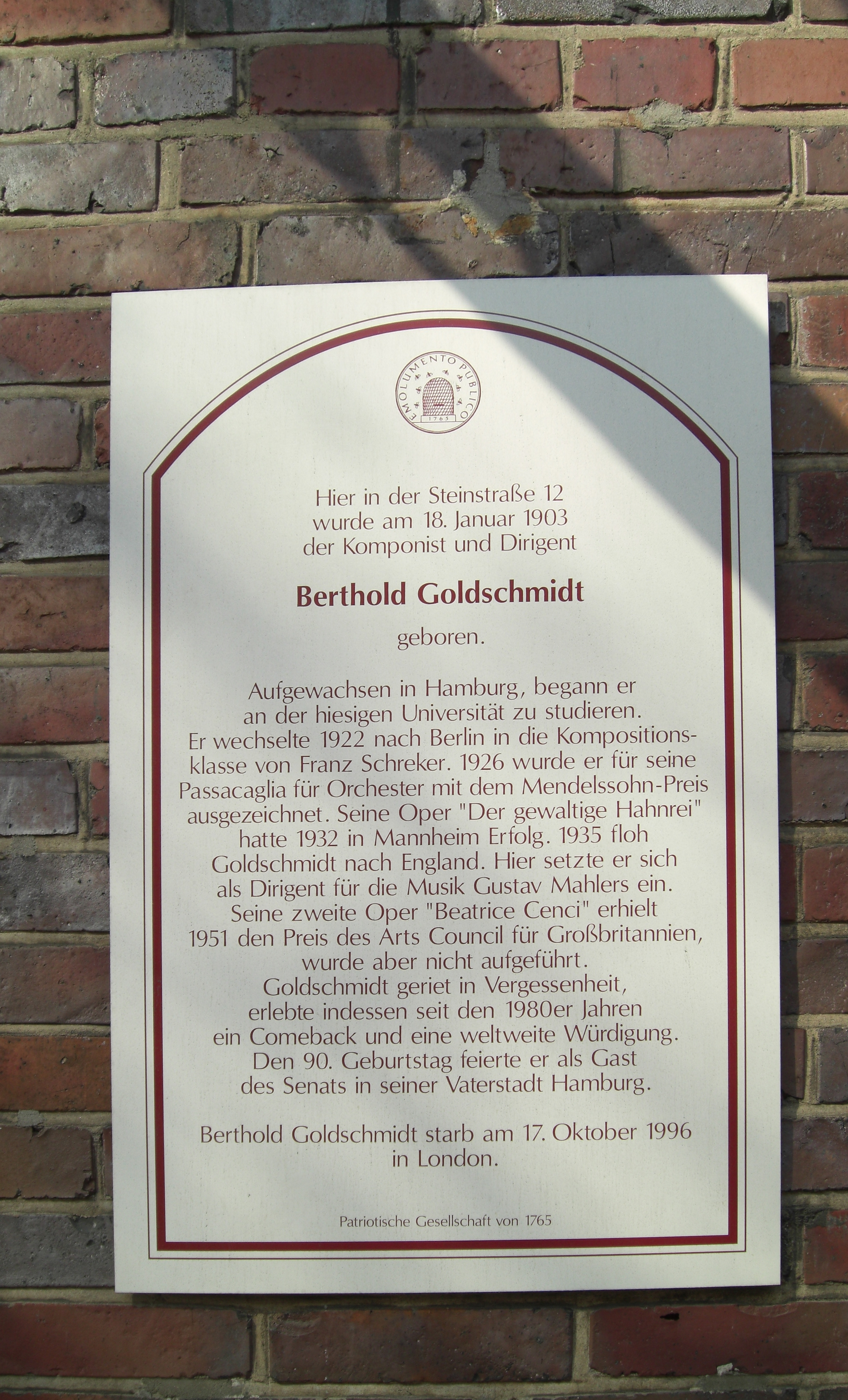
Historic marker at the site of Goldschmidt's birth, Hamburg

Berthold Goldschmidt (18 January 1903 – 17 October 1996) was a German Jewish composer who spent most of his life in England. The suppression of his work by Nazi Germany, as well as the disdain with which many modernist critics elsewhere dismissed his "anachronistic" lyricism, stranded the composer in the wilderness for many years before he was given a revival in his final decade.

== Life ==
Goldschmidt was born in Hamburg, Germany, in 1903. His musical career began in earnest during the heyday of the Weimar Republic. While studying philosophy at the University of Hamburg, he was encouraged by the Italian composer Ferruccio Busoni to write music. In 1922, Goldschmidt entered the Berlin Hochschule für Musik and joined Franz Schreker's composition class, where his fellow pupils included Ernst Krenek, Alois Hába, Felix Petryek, and Jascha Horenstein. He also studied conducting, played freelance for the Berlin Philharmonic Orchestra, and in 1923, coached the choir for the Berlin premiere of Arnold Schoenberg's Gurre-Lieder. In 1925, Goldschmidt achieved his first major success with his Passacaglia, Op. 4, which earned him the prestigious Mendelssohn Prize. Hailed as one of the brightest hopes of a generation of young composers, Goldschmidt reached the premature climax of his career with the premiere of his opera Der gewaltige Hahnrei in Mannheim in 1932.

This triumph happened on the eve of the Nazi takeover of Germany, which quickly destroyed Goldschmidt's livelihood. Like many Jewish composers (and other composers considered subversive of the Germanic purity of the Third Reich), Goldschmidt had his work condemned as "degenerate music" by the regime. There was no place in German musical life for Goldschmidt since performances of his work were banned and he was barred from conducting orchestras. Goldschmidt resorted to earning a living by giving piano lessons, before finally leaving the country on the advice of an SS officer and emigrating to England in 1935.

During World War II, Goldschmidt worked for the BBC and served as the music director of its German Service in 1944-47. While taking jobs in conducting, Goldschmidt also composed works such as the Ciaccona Sinfonica, concertos for violin, cello, and clarinet, and the opera Beatrice Cenci. The English attitude towards Goldschmidt's music was generally indifferent. Even though Beatrice Cenci, an opera based on the 1819 play The Cenci by Percy Bysshe Shelley, won first prize in the 1951 Festival of Britain opera competition, Covent Garden refused to mount a production. Neglected by the musical establishment, Goldschmidt decided to abandon original composition in 1958. For the next six years, he collaborated with Deryck Cooke on producing a performing edition of Gustav Mahler's Tenth Symphony. On 13 August 1964, at the Proms, Goldschmidt conducted the London Symphony Orchestra in the world premiere of the Cooke realization.

The last years of Goldschmidt's life witnessed a renewed interest in the composers of so-called "degenerate music." In 1983, to mark Goldschmidt's 80th birthday, friend and conductor Bernard Keeffe mounted a run-through (the only performance in the UK to date) of scenes from Der gewaltige Hahnrei at Trinity College of Music in London. This performance was attended by David Drew, which led to a publishing collaboration with Boosey & Hawkes. This revival led to performances of his work in the United States and Germany, new recordings, and the recovery of a number of lost manuscripts. His opera Beatrice Cenci, rejected in 1951, was given a concert performance in 1988 and a fully staged performance in 1994.

Goldschmidt had resumed composing in 1982 with the Clarinet Quartet and penned his final work, the Deux nocturnes, just before his death at the age of 93. Champions of his work include the conductors Simon Rattle, Charles Dutoit and Bernard Keeffe; the violinist Chantal Juillet; the Mandelring string quartet; and the record companies Largo and Decca.

He died in London in 1996, aged 93.

== Works ==
=== Operas ===
- Der gewaltige Hahnrei, Op. 14 (1929–30). A musical tragi-comedy in three acts.
- Beatrice Cenci (1949–50). Opera in three acts, based on the 1819 play The Cenci by Percy Bysshe Shelley.

=== Orchestral works ===
- Passacaglia, Op. 4 (1925)
- Overture: The Comedy of Errors (1925/28)
- Suite, Op. 5 (1927)
- Partita, Op. 9 (1927)
- Der gewaltige Hahnrei: Suite, Op. 14a (1933)
- Marche Militaire, Op. 20 (1932) for orchestra or wind band (later incorporated into Chronica)
- Ciaccona Sinfonica (1936)
- Chronica (1938/58/86)
- Polish Dance Suite (1939–40)
- Greek Suite (1940–41)
- Awake, the voice commands (1947) - Bach's chorale Wachet auf, ruft uns die Stimme, transcribed for orchestra
- Violin Concerto (1952/55)
- Cello Concerto (1953)
- Clarinet Concerto (1953–54)
- Intrada (1985) for orchestra or wind band (later incorporated into Chronica)
- Rondeau 'Rue du Rocher' for violin and orchestra (1994–95)

=== Chamber works ===
- String Quartet No. 1, Op. 8 (1925–26)
- String Quartet No. 2 (1936)
- Carols for string trio (1948)
- Clarinet Quartet (1982–83)
- Piano Trio (1985)
- String Quartet No. 3 (1988–89)
- Berceuse for violin and viola (1990)
- Retrospectrum for string trio (1991)
- Fantasy for oboe, cello and harp (1991)
- Capriccio for solo violin (1991–92)
- String Quartet No. 4 (1992)
- Dialogue with Cordelia for clarinet and cello (1993)
- Encore, une meditation agitée for violin and piano (1993)
- Rondeau 'Rue du Rocher' for violin and piano (1994–95)

=== Vocal works ===
- Two Morgenstern Songs, Op. 27 for voice and piano or string trio (1933 arr.1992)
- Three Songs, Op. 24 for coloratura soprano and piano (1933–34)
- Two Psalms, Op. 34 for high voice and string orchestra (1935)
- Der Verflossene. Cabaret Song for voice and piano (1942)
- Beatrice's Song for soprano and piano (1949)
- Time for voice and piano (1943)
- Nicodemus, he was black for unaccompanied voice (1948)
- The Noble Little Soldier's Wife for baritone and xylophone (1948)
- Clouds for voice and piano or orchestra (1950)
- The Old Ships for voice and piano (1952)
- Mediterranean Songs for tenor and orchestra (1957–58)
- Les petits adieux for baritone and orchestra (1994)
- Deux nocturnes for soprano and orchestra (1995–96)

=== Choral works ===
- Letzte Kapitel, Op. 15 (1930–31) for speaker, chorus, percussion and piano (first performance 1984)
- Belsatzar (1985) for unaccompanied chorus

=== Piano works ===
- Piano Sonata, Op. 10 (1926)
- Capriccio, Op. 11 (1927) (written for Zdenka Ticharich)
- Marche Militaire, Op. 20 (1932)
- Variations on a Palestine Shepherd's Song, Op. 32 (1934)
- Little Legend (1923/57)
- From the Ballet (1938/57)
- Scherzo (1922/58)

Principal publisher: Boosey & Hawkes
