= Hans Krása =

Czech composer (1899–1944)

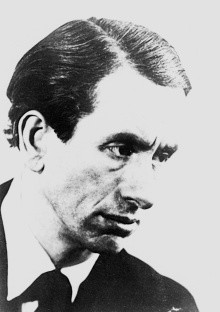
- Krása before 1935
- Born: 30 November 1899; Prague, Austria-Hungary
- Died: 17 October 1944 (aged 44); Auschwitz-Birkenau, German-occupied Poland
- Occupation: Composer

Hans Krása (30 November 1899 – 17 October 1944) was a Czech composer. He was killed during the Holocaust at Auschwitz-Birkenau. He helped to organize cultural life in Theresienstadt concentration camp.

== Life ==
Hans Krása was born in Prague to the German Anna (Steiner) and Karl Krása, a Czech lawyer. Both were Jewish. He studied both the piano and violin as a child and went on to study composition at the German Music Academy in Prague. After graduating, he went on to become a répétiteur at the Neues Deutsches Theater, where he met the composer and conductor Alexander von Zemlinsky, who had a major influence on Krása's career.

In 1927 he followed Zemlinsky to Berlin, where he was introduced to Albert Roussel. Krása, whose primary influences were Mahler, Schoenberg and Zemlinsky, also felt an affinity with French music, especially the group of composers known as Les Six and made a number of trips to France to study under Roussel while he lived in Berlin. Krása eventually returned, homesick, to Prague to resume his old job as a répétiteur at the Neues Deutsches Theater. His debut as a composer came with his Four Orchestral Songs, Op. 1, based on the Galgenlieder (Gallows Songs) of Christian Morgenstern. The work was first performed under Zemlinsky's direction in Prague in May 1921 and was widely acclaimed. There followed a string quartet, a set of five songs for voice and piano and his Symphonie für kleines Orchester, which was performed in Zürich, Paris and Boston. His major achievement, however, was the opera Verlobung im Traum (Betrothal in a Dream) after the novel Uncle's Dream by Dostoyevsky. This work was first performed at the Neues Deutsches Theater in Prague in 1933 under Georg Szell and was awarded the Czechoslovak State Prize.

Brundibár, a children's opera based on a play by Aristophanes, was the last work Krása completed before he was arrested by the Nazis on 10 August 1942. Krása was sent to the Theresienstadt ghetto where he reworked Brundibár with the available cast “and scattered salt of staging”, who then performed it 55 times in the camp, with excerpts featured in the propaganda film made for the Red Cross in 1944. While he was interned in the ghetto, Krása was at his most productive, producing a number of chamber works including Tans, Theme with Variations, and Pascaglia and Fugue, although, due to the circumstances, some of these have not survived. He also contributed to the musical culture of Theresienstadt as a pianist, accompanist, and conductor. He was a leading figure of interwar Czech modernism, and a symbol of artistic resistance during the Holocaust.

== Death ==
Along with fellow composers Viktor Ullmann, Pavel Haas and Gideon Klein, Krása was taken to Auschwitz. He was murdered on 17 October 1944.

== Works ==
- 4 Orchesterlieder, Op. 1 (1920) (text by Christian Morgenstern)
- String Quartet, Op. 2 (1921)
- Symphonie für kleines Orchester (1923)
- 5 Lieder, Op. 4, for voice and piano (1925) (text by Rainer Maria Rilke, Catullus, Christian Morgenstern)
- Verlobung im Traum (Betrothal in a Dream) (1928–30), opera in two acts after the novel Uncle's Dream by Feodor Dostoyevsky
- Die Erde ist des Herrn (The Earth is the Lord's) (1931), cantata for soloists, chorus and orchestra.
- Kammermusik for harpsichord and seven instruments (1936)
- Theme and Variations for string quartet (1936)
- Brundibár (1938–43), symbolic anti-Nazi opera
- Three Songs for baritone, clarinet, viola and cello (1943) (text by Arthur Rimbaud)
- Overture for small orchestra (1943)
- Tanec, dance for string trio (1944)
- Passacaglia and Fugue for string trio (1944)

== Recordings ==
His Three Songs after poems by Arthur Rimbaud, Čtyřverší, Vzrušení and Přátelé, sung by Christian Gerhaher, appear on the CD Terezín - Theresienstadt initiated by Anne Sofie von Otter, Deutsche Grammophon, 2007.

His String Quartet appears on Pavel Haas and Hans Krása: String Quartets, performed by the Hawthorne String Quartet as part of the Decca series, Entartete Musik, label: Decca 440 853–2. As part of the same series his opera Verlobung im Traum (Betrothal in a Dream) and Symphonie appeared in recordings by the Deutsches Symphonie-Orchester Berlin conducted by Lothar Zagrosek and Vladimir Ashkenazy respectively, label: Decca 455 587–2.
