= List of compositions by Othmar Schoeck =

This is a list of compositions by Othmar Schoeck.

== Piano ==
=== Piano Solo ===
- Zwei Klavierstücke, Op. 29
- Ritornelle und Fugetten, Op. 68

== Chamber music ==
=== Violin and Piano ===
- Violin Sonata in D major, Op. 16
- Violin Sonata in E major, Op. 46
- Violin Sonata in D major, WoO 22

=== Cello and Piano ===
- Cello Sonata, WoO 47 (1957)

=== String Quartet ===
- String Quartet No. 1 in D major, Op. 23
- String Quartet No. 2 in C major, Op. 37
- String Quartet Movement in D major, WoO 75

=== Other ===
- Sonata for Bass Clarinet and Piano, Op. 41
- Andante for Clarinet or Viola and Piano

== Orchestral ==
- Serenade for Small Orchestra, Op. 1
- Prelude for Orchestra, Op. 48
- Summernight for String Orchestra, Op. 58
- Suite in A♭ major for String Orchestra, Op. 59
- Festlicher Hymnus for Orchestra, Op. 64

== Concertante ==
- Violin Concerto in B♭ major, Op. 21
- Serenade for Oboe, English Horn and Strings, Op. 27
- Concerto for Cello and String Orchestra, Op. 61 (1947)
- Concerto for Horn and String Orchestra, Op. 65

== Incidental Music ==
- Erwin und Elmire, songs and incidental music for 4 solo voice and Orchestra, Op. 25
- Das Wandbild, Op. 28
- Der Schatz im Silbersee

== Opera ==
- Don Ranudo de Colibrados, Op. 27
- Venus, Op. 32
- Penthesilea, Op. 39
- Massimilla Doni (opera), Op. 50
- Das Schloss Dürande, Op. 53

== Choral Music ==
- Vom Fischer un syner Fru (Cantata), Op. 43
- Eichendorff Cantata, Op. 49
- Maschinenschlacht, Op. 67a
- Gestutzte Eiche, Op. 67b
- Seeli for Men's Choir
- Postillion for Men's Choir and Orchestra
- Zimmerspruch for Men's Choir

== Lieder ==
- Drüben geht die Sonne scheiden, Op. 2/1
- Trübe wird's, die Wolken jagen, Op. 2/2
- Auf geheimem Waldespfade, Op. 2/3
- Ruhetal, Op. 3/1
- Die Kapelle, Op. 3/2
- Abschied, Op. 3/3
- Lebewohl, Op. 3/4
- Scheiden und meiden, Op. 3/5
- Auf den Tod eines Kindes, Op. 3/6
- Sommerabend, Op. 4/1
- Warum sind denn die Rosen so blass?, Op. 4/2
- Wo? Wo wird einst des Wandermüden, Op. 4/3
- Himmelstrauer, Op. 5/1
- An die Entfernte, Op. 5/2
- Frühlingsblick, Op. 5/3
- Die Verlassene, Op. 6/1
- Schifferliedchen, Op. 6/2
- Vor der Ernte, Op. 6/3
- Alle meine Wünsche schweigen, Op. 6/4
- Marienlied, Op. 6/5
- Mandolinen, Op. 6/6
- Bei der Kirche, Op. 7/1
- Septembermorgen, Op. 7/2
- In der Herberge, Op. 7/3
- Elisabeth, Op. 8/1
- Aus zwei Tälern, Op. 8/2
- Auskunft, Op. 8/3
- Jahrestag, Op. 8/4
- Die Verklärende, Op. 9/1
- Du, des Erbarmens Feind, Op. 9/2
- Erinnerung, Op. 10/1
- Die Einsame, Op. 10/2
- Guter Rat, Op. 10/3
- Psalm, Op. 11/1
- Psalm 23, Op. 11/2
- Psalm 100, Op. 11/3
- Reiselied, Op. 12/1
- Wanderlied der Prager Studenten, Op. 12/2
- Vergiftet sind meine Lieder, Op. 13/1
- Ja, du bist elend, Op. 13/2
- Dilemma, Op. 13/3
- An meine Mutter, Op. 14/1
- Das Schlummerlied, Op. 14/2
- Schöner Ort, Op. 14/3
- Schlafen, nichts als schlafen, Op. 14/4
- Der Waldsee, Op. 15/1
- Nun quill aus meiner Seele, Op. 15/2
- Frühlingsfeier, Op. 15/3
- In der Fremde, Op. 15/4
- Erster Verlust, Op. 15/5
- Peregrina, Op. 15/6
- Im Sommer, Op. 17/1
- Im Herbste, Op. 17/2
- Der Kirchhof im Frühling, Op. 17/3
- Peregrina II, Op. 17/4
- Gekommen ist der Maie, Op. 17/5
- Auf einer Burg, Op. 17/6
- Erinnerung, Op. 17/7
- Der frohe Wandersmann, Op. 17/8
- Der Postillion, Op. 18
- Herbstgefühl, Op. 19a/1
- Dämm'rung senkte sich von oben, Op. 19a/2
- Mailied, Op. 19a/3
- Mit einem gemalten Band, Op. 19a/4
- Rastlose Liebe, Op. 19a/5
- Sorge, Op. 19a/6
- Ungeduld, Op. 19a/7
- Parabase, Op. 19a/8
- Nachklang, Op. 19b/1
- Suleika und Hatem, Op. 19b/2
- Suleika, Op. 19b/3
- Haben sie von deinen Fehlen, Op. 19b/4a
- Höre den Rat, den die Leier tont, Op. 19b/4b
- Wie ich so ehrlich war, Op. 19b/4c
- Unmut, Op. 19b/5
- Selige Sehnsucht, Op. 19b/6
- Warum leckst du dein Mäulchen, Op. 19b/7a
- Eine einzige Nacht an deinem Herzen, Op. 19b/7b
- Wie sie klingeln, die Pfaffen!, Op. 19/7c
- Seh' ich den Pilgrim, Op. 19/7d
- Diese Gondel vergleich ich, Op. 19/7e
- Auf ein Kind, Op. 20/1
- An einem heitern Morgen, Op. 20/2
- Dichtersegen, Op. 20/3
- Frühlingsruhe, Op. 20/4
- Wein und Brot, Op. 20/5
- Abendwolken, Op. 20/6
- Abschied, Op. 20/7
- Auf meines Kindes Tod, Op. 20/8
- Der Kranke, Op. 20/9
- Abendlandschaft, Op. 20/10
- Der Gärtner, Op. 20/11
- Umkehr, Op. 20/12
- Nachtlied, Op. 20/13
- Nachruf, Op. 20/14
- Dithyrambe, Op. 22
- Wegelied, Op. 24
- Lenz, Op. 24a/1
- Stumme Liebe, Op. 24a/2
- An die Entfernte, Op. 24a/3
- Die drei Zigeuner, Op. 24a/4
- Das Heiligste, Op. 24a/5
- Manche Nacht, Op. 24a/6
- Das bescheidene Wünschlein, Op. 24a/7
- Glöckleins Klage, Op. 24a/8
- Der Hufschmied, Op. 24a/9
- Eine Unbekanntschaft, Op. 24a/10
- Ein Jauchzer, Op. 24b/1
- Jünger des Weins I, Op. 24b/2
- Jünger des Weins II, Op. 24b/3
- Kennst du das auch?, Op. 24b/4
- Was lachst du so?, Op. 24b/5
- Frühling, Op. 24b/6
- Keine Rast, Op. 24b/7
- Das Ziel, Op. 24b/8
- Ravenna, Op. 24b/9
- Jugendgedenken, Op. 24b/10
- Trommelschläge, Op. 26
- Waldeinsamkeit!, Op. 30/1
- Kurze Fahrt, Op. 30/2
- Winternacht, Op. 30/3
- Im Wandern, Op. 30/4
- Sterbeglocken, Op. 30/5
- Ergebung, Op. 30/6
- Nachklang, Op. 30/7
- Der verspätete Wanderer, Op. 30/8
- Nacht, Op. 30/9
- Lockung, Op. 30/10
- An die Lützow'schen Jäger, Op. 30/11
- Auf dem Rhein, Op. 30/12
- Madrigal, Op. 31/1
- Die Kindheit, Op. 31/2
- Im Kreuzgang von St. Stefano, Op. 31/3
- Ruheplatz, Op. 31/4
- Epigramm, Op. 31/5
- Ach, wie schön ist Nacht und Dämmerschein, Op. 33/1
- Höre mir den Prediger, Op. 33/2
- Das Gescheh'ne, nicht bereut's Hafis, Op. 33/3
- Ach, wie richtete, so klagt' ich, Op. 33/4
- Wie stimmst du mich zur Andacht, Op. 33/5
- Meine Lebenszeit verstreicht, Op. 33/6
- Ich habe mich dem Heil entschworen, Op. 33/7
- Ich habe mich dem Heil entschworen, Op. 33/8
- Lieblich in der Rosenzeit, Op. 33/9
- Horch, hörst du nicht vom Himmel her, Op. 33/10
- Nicht düstre, Theosoph, so tief!, Op. 33/11
- Sing, o lieblicher Sängermund, Op. 33/12
- Der Gott und der Bajadere, Op. 34
- Fahre wohl, Op. 35/1
- April, Op. 35/2
- Gottes Segen, Op. 35/3
- Elegie, Op. 36
  - 1. Wehmut (Ich kann wohl manchmal singen)
  - 2. Liebesfrühling (Ich sah den Lenz einmal)
  - 3. Stille Sicherheit (Horch, wie still es wird im dunklen Hain)
  - 4. Frage nicht (Wie sehr ich dein, soll ich dir sagen?)
  - 5. Warnung und Wunsch (Lebe nicht so schnell und stürmisch)
  - 6. Zweifelnder Wunsch (Wenn Worte dir vom Rosenmunde weh'n)
  - 7. Waldlied 1 (Durch den Hain mit bangem Stoße)
  - 8. Waldgang (Ich ging an deiner Seite)
  - 9. An Den Wind (Ich wand're fort ins ferne Land)
  - 10. Kommen und Scheiden (So oft sie kam)
  - 11. Vesper (Die Abendglocken klangen)
  - 12. Herbstklage (Holder Lenz, du bist dahin!)
  - 13. Herbstgefühl 1 (Mürrisch braust der Eichenwald)
  - 14. Nachklang (Schon kehren die Vögel wieder ein)
  - 15. Herbstgefühl 2 (Der Buchenwald ist herbstlich schon gerötet)
  - 16. Das Mondlicht (Dein gedenkend irr' ich einsam)
  - 17. Vergangenheit (Hesperus, der blasse Funken)
  - 18. Waldlied 2 (Die Vögel flieh'n geschwind zum Nest)
  - 19. Herbstentschluss (Trübe Wolken, Herbstesluft)
  - 20. Verlorenes Glück (Die Bäume rauschen hier noch immer)
  - 21. Angedenken (Berg und Täler wieder fingen)
  - 22. Welke Rose (In einem buche blätternd)
  - 23. Dichterlos (Für alle muss vor Freuden)
  - 24. Der Einsame (Komm, Trost der Welt)
- Unser ist das Los der Epigonen, Op. 38/1
- O heiliger Augustin im Himmelssaal, Op. 38/2
- Der Herr gab dir ein gutes Augenpaar, Op. 38/3
- Wenn schlanke Lilien wandelten, Op. 38/4
- Nun schmücke mir dein dunkles Haar, Op. 38/5
- Perlen der Weisheit sind mir deine Zähne, Op. 38/6
- Ich halte dich in meinem Arm, Op. 38/7
- Berge dein Haupt, wenn ein König vorbeigeht, Op. 38/8
- Mich tadelt der Fanatiker, Op. 38/9
- Verbogen und zerkniffen war der vordre Rand an meinem Hut, Op. 38/10
- Wie poltert es! Abscheuliches Geröll, Op. 40/1
- Da lieg' ich denn, ohnmächtiger Geselle, Op. 40/2
- Ha! was ist das?, Op. 40/3
- Läg' ich, wo es Hyänen gibt, Op. 40/4
- Horch! Stimmen und Geschrei, Op. 40/5
- Als endlich sie den Sarg hier abgesetzt, Op. 40/6
- Horch – endlich zittert es durch meine Bretter!, Op. 40/7
- Da hab' ich gar die Rose aufgegessen, Op. 40/8
- Zwölf hat's geschlagen, Op. 40/9
- Ja, hätt' ich ein verlass'nes Liebchen nun, Op. 40/10
- Wie herrlich wär's, zerschnitt'ner Tannenbaum, Op. 40/11
- Der erste Tannenbaum, den ich geseh'n, Op. 40/12
- Der schönste Tannenbaum, den ich geseh'n, Op. 40/13
- Und wieder schlägt's – ein Viertel erst und zwölfe!, Op. 40/14
- Es geht wohl anders, als du meinst, Op. 42/1
- Herz, in deinen sonnenhellen Tagen, Op. 42/2
- Was willst auf dieser Station?, Op. 42/3
- Die Lerche grüßt den ersten Strahl, Op. 42/4
- Wenn der Hahn kräht auf dem Dache, Op. 42/5
- Der Sturm geht lärmend um das Haus, Op. 42/6
- Ewig munt'res Spiel der Wogen, Op. 42/7
- Der Wand'rer von der Heimat weit, Op. 42/8
- Nachtgefühl, Op. 44/1
- Magie der Farben, Op. 44/2
- Verwelkende Rosen, Op. 44/3
- Abends, Op. 44/4
- Mittag im September, Op. 44/5
- Blauer Schmetterling, Op. 44/6
- Pfeifen, Op. 44/7
- Sommernacht, Op. 44/8
- Für Ninon, Op. 44/9
- Vergänglichkeit, Op. 44/10
- Erinnerung: Du warst mir ein gar trauter, lieber Geselle, Op. 45/1
- Aufbruch: Des Himmelsfrohes Antlitz brannte, Op. 45/2
- Die Lerche: Froh summte nach der süßen Beute, Op. 45/3
- Der Eichwald: Ich trat in einen heilig düstern Eichwald, Op. 45/4
- Der Hirte: Schon zog vom Wald ich, Op. 45/5
- Einsamkeit: Schon seh' ich Hirt' und Herde nimmer, Op. 45/6
- Die Ferne: Des Berges Gipfel war erschwungen, Op. 45/7
- Das Gewitter: Noch immer lag ein tiefes Schweigen, Op. 45/8
- Der Schlaf: Ein Greis trat lächelnd mir entgegen, Op. 45/9
- Der Abend: Die Wolken waren fortgezogen, Op. 45/10
- Notturno, Op. 47, song cycle for baritone and string quartet
- Nachtgruß, Op. 51/1
- Motto, Op. 51/2
- Trost, Op. 51/3
- Er ist's, Op. 51/4
- Septembermorgen, Op. 51/5
- Spruch, Op. 51/6
- Die Liebe: Die Liebe hemmet nichts, Op. 52/1
- Phidile: Ich war erst sechzehn Sommer alt, Op. 52/2
- Ein Wiegenlied, bei Mondschein zu singen: So schlafe nun, du Kleine!, Op. 52/3
- Als er sein Weib und's Kind schlafend fand: Das heiß' ich rechte Augenweide, Op. 52/4
- Die Natur: Tausend Blumen um mich her, Op. 52/5
- Der Frühling: Heute will ich fröhlich, fröhlich sein, Op. 52/6
- Die Sternseherin: Ich sehe oft um Mitternacht, Op. 52/7
- Kuckuck: Wir Vögel singen nicht egal, Op. 52/8
- Ein Lied, hinterm Ofen zu singen: Der Winter ist ein rechter Mann, Op. 52/9
- Abendlied: Der Mond ist aufgegangen, Op. 52/10
- Der Mensch: Empfangen und genähret, Op. 52/11
- Die Römer: Die Römer, die, vor vielen hundert Jahren, Op. 52/12
- Der Schwarze in der Zuckerplantage: Weit von meinem Vaterlande, Op. 52/13
- Der Krieg: 's ist Krieg, 's ist Krieg!, Op. 52/14
- Auf den Tod einer Kaiserin: Sie machte Frieden, Op. 52/15
- Der Tod: Ach, es ist so dunkel in des Todes Kammer, Op. 52/16
- Spruch: Der Mensch lebt und bestehet, Op. 52/17
- Für ein Gesangfest im Frühling, Op. 54
- Trost der Kreatur: Wie schlafend unterm Flügel, Op. 55/1
- Sonnenuntergang: In Gold und Purpur tief verhüllt, Op. 55/2
- Siehst du den Stern, Op. 55/3
- Stille der Nacht: Willkommen, klare Sommernacht, Op. 55/4
- Unter Sternen: Wende dich, du kleiner Stern, Op. 55/5
- Abendlied an die Natur: Hüll' ein mich in die grünen Decken, Op. 55/6
- Unruhe der Nacht: Nun bin ich untreu worden, Op. 55/7
- Aus den Waldliedern I: Arm in Arm und Kron' an Krone, Op. 55/8
- Aus den Waldliedern II: Aber auch den Föhrenwald, Op. 55/9
- Stilleben (aus den Rheinbildern): Durch Bäume dringt ein leiser Ton, Op. 55/10
- Das Tal (aus den Rheinbildern): Mit dem grauen Felsensaal, Op. 55/11
- Abendlied: Augen, meine lieben Fensterlein, Op. 55/12
- Wir wähnten lange recht zu leben, Op. 55/13
- Flack're, ew'ges Licht im Tal, Op. 55/14
- Die Zeit geht nicht, Op. 55/15
- Trübes Wetter: Es ist ein stiller Regentag, Op. 55/16
- Frühgesicht (aus den Rheinbildern): Es donnert über der Pfaffengass', Op. 55/17
- Frühlingsglaube: Es wandert eine schöne Sage, Op. 55/18
- In der Trauer: Ein Meister bin ich worden, Op. 55/19
- Den Zweifellosen I: Wer ohne Leid, der ist auch ohne Liebe, Op. 55/20
- Den Zweifellosen II: Es ist nicht Selbstsucht, Op. 55/21
- Tod und Dichter: Deiner bunten Blasen Kinderfreude, Op. 55/22
- An das Herz: Willst du nicht dich schließen, Op. 55/23
- Aus: Ein Tagewerk I: Vom Lager stand ich mit dem Frühlicht auf, Op. 55/24
- Aus: Ein Tagewerk II: Aber ein kleiner goldener Stern, Op. 55/25
- O Frühlingshauch, o Liederlust, Op. 56/1
- Die Ströme zieh'n zum fernen Meer, Op. 56/2
- Ich bin ein Spielmann von Beruf, Op. 56/3
- Und wieder nehm' ich die Harfe zur Hand, Op. 56/4
- Mein Herz ist wie ein Saitenspiel, Op. 56/5
- O Lebensfrühling, Blütendrang, Op. 56/6
- Leidenschaft: Was immer mir die Feindschaft unterschoben, Op. 57/1
- Muttersprache: Dich vor allem, heilige Muttersprache, Op. 57/2
- Liederfrühling: Der Lenz ist da, Op. 57/3
- Waldeinsamkeit: Wo über mir die Waldnacht finster, Op. 57/4
- Vorwurf: Wohl ist es schön, auf fauler Haut, Op. 57/5
- Rechtfertigung: Nicht, daß ich dies Bestreben nicht erfasse, Op. 57/6
- Abkehr: Wie einst den Knaben lacht ihr noch heut mich an, Op. 57/7
- Waldvögelein: Waldvögelein, wohin ziehst du?, Op. 57/8
- Aus dem Süden: Nicht allein in Rathaussälen, Op. 57/9
- Riviera: In diesen Silberhainen von Oliven, Op. 57/10
- Nacht, Muse und Tod: Komm, ambrosische Nacht, Op. 57/11
- Sapphische Strophe: Schweigen rings; im Garten der Villa plaudert, Op. 57/12
- Sonnenuntergang: O wie träumt es sich süß, Op. 57/13
- Warnung: Wenn ein Gott dir gab fürs Schöne, Op. 57/14
- Heimweh: Hier pflegt Natur mit ihren gold'nen Auen, Op. 57/15
- Rückkehr: Schon verstummt das Lied der Grille, Op. 57/16
- Einst: Ihr Bilder, die die Zeit begrub, Op. 57/17
- An meine Großmutter: Wie floß von deiner Lippe milde Güte, Op. 57/18
- Trauer: Ein unbezwingbar dunkler Hang, Op. 57/19
- Der Waldsee: Wie bist du schön, du tiefer, blauer See!, Op. 57/20
- Im Klosterkeller: Hier scheidet die Klosterpforte, Op. 57/21
- Trinklied: Greift zum Becher und laßt das Schelten!, Op. 57/22
- Distichen, Strophenlied im Tone einer Schnitzelbank: Selbstzweck sei sich die Kunst, Op. 57/23
- Spruch: Ein guter Ruf ist wie ein wohnlich Haus, Op. 57/24
- Unmut: Du sahst mich schweigen oft im Tonregister, Op. 57/25
- Trost: Nun lass' das Lamentieren, Op. 57/26
- Das Heilige Feuer: Auf das Feuer mit dem gold'nen Strahle, Op. 60/1
- Liederseelen: In der Nacht, die die Bäume mit Blüten deckt, Op. 60/2
- Reisephantasie: Mittagsruhe haltend auf den Matten, Op. 60/3
- Mit einem Jugendbildnis: Hier - doch keinem darfst du' s zeigen, Op. 60/4
- Am Himmelstor: Mir träumt, ich komm' ans Himmelstor, Op. 60/5
- In einer Sturmnacht: Es fährt der Wind gewaltig durch die Nacht, Op. 60/6
- In Harmesnächten: Die Rechte streckt' ich schmerzlich oft, Op. 60/7
- Lenzfahrt: Am Himmel wächst der Sonne Glut, Op. 60/8
- Frühling Triumphator: Frühling, der die Welt umblaut, Op. 60/9
- Unruhige Nacht: Heut ward mir bis zum jungen Tag, Op. 60/10
- Was treibst du, Wind?, Op. 60/11
- Hochzeitslied: Aus der Eltern Macht und Haus, Op. 60/12
- Der Gesang des Meeres: Wolken, meine Kinder, Op. 60/13
- Der römische Brunnen: Aufsteigt der Strahl, Op. 60/14
- Das Ende des Festes: Da mit Sokrates die Freunde tranken, Op. 60/15
- Die Jungfrau: Wo sah ich, Mädchen, deine Züge, Op. 60/16
- Neujahrsglocken: In den Lüften schwellendes Gedröhne, Op. 60/17
- Alle: Es sprach der Geist: Sieh auf!, Op. 60/18
- Der Reisebecher, Op. 60/19
- Das weiße Spitzchen: Ein blendendes Spitzchen, Op. 60/20
- Göttermahl: Wo die Tannenfinstre Schatten werfen, Op. 60/21
- Ich würd' es hören: Läg' dort unterm Firneschein, Op. 60/22
- Firnelicht: Wie pocht' das Herz mir in der Brust, Op. 60/23
- Schwarzschattende Kastanie, Op. 60/24
- Requiem: Bei der Abendsonne Wandern, Op. 60/25
- Abendwolke: So stille ruht im Hafen, Op. 60/26
- Nachtgeräusche: Melde mir die Nachtgeräusche, Muse, Op. 60/27
- Jetzt rede du!: Du warest mir ein täglich Wanderziel, Op. 60/28
- Widmung: Die kleine Welt, mit ihren Glanzgestalten, Op. 62/1
- An einem Wintermorgen, vor Sonnenaufgang: O flaumenleichte Zeit der dunkeln Frühe!, Op. 62/2
- Gesang zu zweien in der Nacht: Wie süß der Nachtwind, Op. 62/3
- Am Walde: Am Waldsaum kann ich lange Nachmittage, Op. 62/4
- An Philomele: Tonleiterähnlich steiget dein Klaggesang, Op. 62/5
- Auf der Teck (Rauhe Alb): Hier ist Freude, hier ist Lust, Op. 62/6
- Das Mädchen an den Mai: Es ist doch im April fürwahr, Op. 62/7
- Im Park: Sieh, der Kastanie kindliches Laub, Op. 62/8
- Mein Fluß: O Fluß, mein Fluß im Morgenstrahl, Op. 62/9
- Lose Ware: Tinte! Tinte, wer braucht!, Op. 62/10
- Ritterliche Werbung: "Wo gehst du hin, du schönes Kind?", Op. 62/11
- Die Schwestern: Wir Schwestern zwei, wir schönen, Op. 62/12
- Schön-Rotraut: Wie heißt König Ringangs Töchterlein?, Op. 62/13
- Peregrina: Aufgeschmückt ist der Freudensaal, Op. 62/14
- Zu viel: Der Himmel glänzt vom reinsten Frühlingslichte, Op. 62/15
- Nachts am Schreibepult: Primel und Stern und Syringe, Op. 62/16
- Aus der Ferne: Weht, o wehet, liebe Morgenwinde!, Op. 62/17
- Nur zu!: Schön prangt im Silbertau die junge Rose, Op. 62/18
- Auf eine Lampe: Noch unverrückt, o schöne Lampe, Op. 62/19
- Nachts: Horch! Auf der Erde feuchtem Grund gelegen, Op. 62/20
- Antike Poesie (An Goethe): Ich sah den Helikon, Op. 62/21
- Erinna an Sappho: "Vielfach sind zum Hades die Pfade", Op. 62/22
- Johann Kepler: Gestern, als ich vom nächtlichen Lager, Op. 62/23
- Keine Rettung: Kunst! o in deine Arme, Op. 62/24
- Nach dem Kriege: Bei euren Taten, euren Siegen, Op. 62/25
- In ein Autographen-Album: Mein Wappen ist nicht adelig, Op. 62/26
- Impromptu (An Mörikes Hündchen Joli): Die ganz' Welt ist in dich verliebt, Op. 62/27
- Die Enthusiasten: Die Welt wär' ein Sumpf, Op. 62/28
- Trost: Ja, mein Glück, das langgewohnte, Op. 62/29
- Auf ein Ei geschrieben: Ostern ist zwar schon vorbei, Op. 62/30
- Auf einen Klavierspieler: Hört ihn und seht sein dürftig Instrument, Op. 62/31
- Restauration (Nach Durchlesung eines Manuskriptes mit Gedichten): Das süße Zeug ohne Saft und Kraft!, Op. 62/32
- Gebet: Herr! Schicke, was du willst, Op. 62/33
- Der Hirtenknabe (Zu einer Zeichnung L. Richters): Vesperzeit, Betgeläut, Op. 62/34
- Auf ein Kind (das mir eine ausgerissene Haarlocke vorwies): Mein Kind, in welchem Krieg, Op. 62/35
- Zu einer Konfirmation: Bei jeder Wendung deiner Lebensbahn, Op. 62/36
- In der Krankheit: Muse und Dichter: "Krank nun vollends und matt!", Op. 62/37
- In der Krankheit: Auf dem Krankenbette: Gleich wie ein Vogel am Fenster vorbei, Op. 62/38
- Der Geprüfte: Ist' s möglich? sieht ein Mann so heiter aus, Op. 62/39
- Besuch in Urach: Nur fast so wie im Traum, Op. 62/40
- Vision, Op. 63
- Sonett I: So viele Quellen von den Bergen rauschen, Op. 66/1
- Sonett II: So eitel künstlich haben sie verwoben, Op. 66/2
- Sonett III: Ein Wunderland ist oben aufgeschlagen, Op. 66/3
- Sonett IV: Wer einmal tief und durstig hat getrunken, Op. 66/4
- Zwei zweistimmige Lieder, Op. 69
- Nachhall, Op. 70 (Lenau)
1. Nachhall
2. Einsamkeit
3. Mein Herz
4. Veränderte Welt
5. Abendheimkehr
6. Auf eine holländische Landschaft
7. Stimme des Windes
8. Der falsche Freund
9. Niagara
10. Heimatklang
11. Zwischenspiel
12. Der Kranich
13. O du Land (Claudius)
- Das Grab, WoO 1
- Nachtgesang, WoO 2
- KTV (Kantonsschul-Turnverein)-Kantus, WoO 3
- Geistergruß, WoO 5
- Kinderliedchen, WoO 6
- Lieb Seelchen, laß das Fragen sein, WoO 7
- Selbstbetrug, WoO 8
- Der Gast, WoO 9
- Gleich und gleich, WoO 10
- Über den Bergen, WoO 11
- Mai, WoO 12
- Kindergottesdienst, WoO 13
- Vergangenheit, WoO 14
- Wiegenlied, WoO 15
- Das Fräulein am Meere, WoO 16
- Scheideblick, WoO 17
- Stummer Abschied, WoO 18
- Lebewohl!, WoO 19
- Vorwurf, WoO 27
- Mir glänzen die Augen, WoO 31
- Der Gott und die Bajadere, WoO 34
- Die Entschwundene, WoO 37
- Wiegenlied, WoO 44
- Im Nebel, WoO 45
- Es liegen Veilchen dunkelblau, WoO 51
- Ständchen von (Wilhelm) Busch, WoO 52
- Melodie zur Comment-Buch-Weihe, WoO 53
- Volkslied, WoO 56
- Kinder, WoO 57
- Johanniswürmchen, WoO 59
- Der öde Garten, WoO 60
- In der Dorfschenke, WoO 62
- Tatsache, WoO 64
- Schweizerlied, WoO 65
- Schlaf ein, lieb Kind, WoO 66
- Perlen, WoO 67
- Gefunden, WoO 68
- Sommerabend, WoO 78
- Andante, WoO 82
- Gesang der Mädchen aus Johannes, WoO 83
- O Springquell munterer Schwätzer (Fragment), WoO 85
- An die Türen will ich schleichen, WoO 87
- Lied (Fragment), WoO 90
- Lied (Fragment), WoO 91
- Kennst du das Land (Fragment), WoO 92
- Mit einer Primula veris (Fragment), WoO 94
- Stille Sicherheit (Fragment), WoO 95
- Am einsamen Strande plätschert die Flut (Fragment), WoO 96
- Einkehr, WoO 98
- O du Land, WoO 109
- O du Land, WoO 110
- Spätherbst, WoO 111
- Ernte, WoO 112
- Eine Kompanie Soldaten, WoO 118
- Hölty! dein Freund, der Frühling ist gekommen (Fragment), WoO 129
- Nachhall, WoO 130
- Lied (Fragment), WoO 131
- Proömion (Fragment), WoO 132

== Sources ==
- (in German) Werk- und Nachlassverzeichnis Othmar Schoeck (1886 – 1957). Zentralbibliothek Zürich.
