= Rosamunde Quartett =

German string quartet

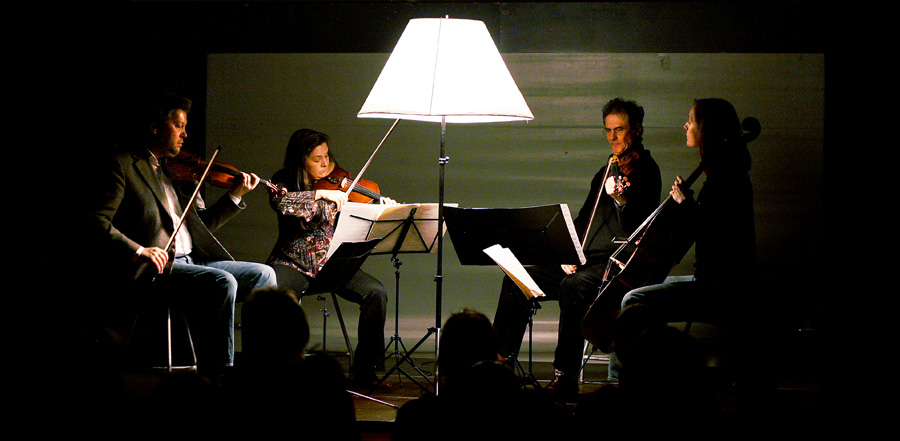

The Rosamunde Quartett was a German string quartet ensemble formed in 1992 and dissolved in 2009. It was named after Franz Schubert's String Quartet No. 13 and the incidental music Rosamunde on which the slow movement of this piece is based. Its members consisted of Andreas Reiner (violin), Diane Pascal (violin), Helmut Nicolai (viola), and Anja Lechner (cello). Simon Fordham (violin) was also previously a member.

== Discography ==
- Boris Yoffe: Song of Songs (with The Hilliard Ensemble) (ECM 2174 NS)
- Othmar Schoeck: Notturno (with Christian Gerhaher) (ECM 2061 NS)
- Thomas Larcher: Ixxu (with Thomas Larcher a.o.) (ECM 1967 NS) (Preis der deutschen Schallplattenkritik)
- Tigran Mansurian: String Quartets (ECM 1905 NS)
- Valentin Silvestrov: leggiero, pesante (with Valentin Silvestrov, Silke Avenhaus, Maacha Deubner) (ECM 1776) (Grammy nomination)
- Joseph Haydn: The Seven Words (ECM 1756 NS)
- Kultrum (with Dino Saluzzi) (ECM 1638 NS)
- Webern / Shostakovich / Burian (ECM 1629 NS) (Preis der deutschen Schallplattenkritik)
