= The Marble Statue =

1818 Novella by Joseph von Eichendorff

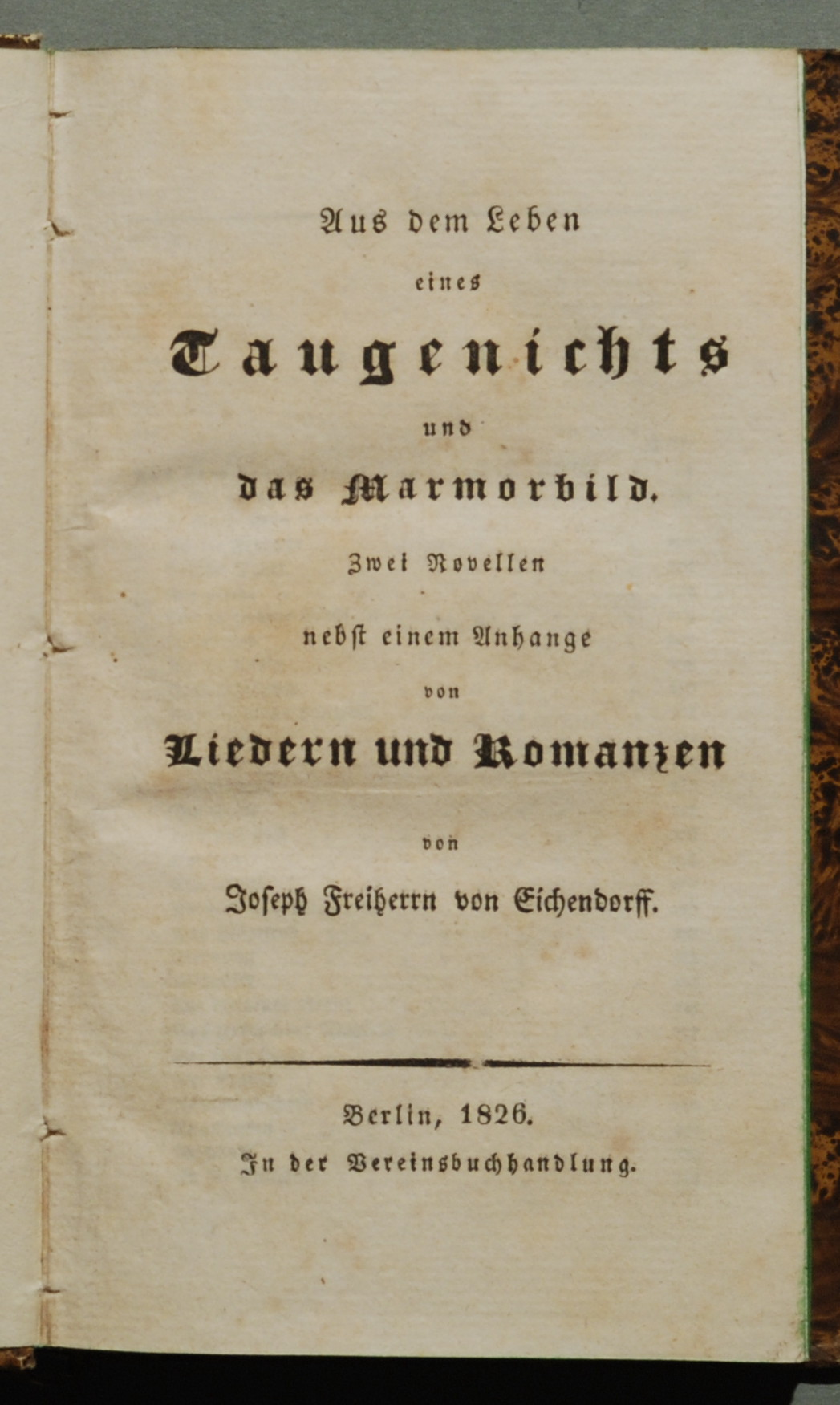
- Title page of "Memoirs of a Good-for-Nothing" and "The Marble Statue", Berlin 1826
- Author: Joseph von Eichendorff
- Original title: Das Marmorbild
- Language: German
- Publication date: 1818
- Publication place: Germany

The Marble Statue (German: Das Marmorbild) is an 1818 novella by the German writer Joseph von Eichendorff. Set around Lucca, it is about a man who struggles to choose between piety, represented by a musician and a beautiful maiden, and a world of art, represented by a statue of Venus.

== Plot ==
On a summer night, the young man Florio finds himself participating in festivities near the gate to Lucca. He becomes acquainted with the famous musician Fortunato, a beautiful maiden he later learns is named Bianca, and the eloquent cavalier Donati. Donati greets Florio as an old friend and knows many details about his youth, but Florio cannot recall having met Donati before.

Florio stays at an inn in Lucca but is unable to sleep and goes for a nightly walk. He finds a marble statue of Venus which seems oddly familiar, reminding him of his youth but also alarming him. Revisiting the statue the next morning, he ends up at an extravagant garden surrounding a palace where he spots a beautiful, singing lady whose features are strikingly similar to those of the statue. He encounters Donati who says the lady is a wealthy relative of his and offers to introduce Florio to her in the near future.

The following morning, Donati invites Florio to go hunting, but the latter refuses because it is Sunday and he wants to go to church. Fortunato invites him to a party in the evening. There, Florio encounters a masked woman in a Greek robe, or possibly two women he conflates. When the woman invites him to visit her home some day and shows her face, Florio recognises her as the lady from the garden. Late at night, Fortunato introduces Florio to the host of the party, who is Bianca's uncle Pietro, as well as Bianca herself, but she is disappointed by Florio's coldness and distraction.

Several days later, Donati brings Florio to the lady's palace. After receiving them in the garden, the lady brings Florio into a chamber, lays down and begins to undress. Florio then hears what sounds like Fortunato singing a pious song outside the palace. When Florio utters a short prayer, a thunderstorm begins to approach, the lady becomes pale and statues begin to come alive, prompting Florio to quickly leave the palace. When he goes back to Donati's villa to ask what happened, he only finds a lowly hut and a gardener who does not know who Donati is.

Florio rides from Lucca and is joined by three riders who turn out to be Fortunato, Pietro and Bianca. They see a dilapidated ruin in the distance and Florio recognises it as the lady's palace. Pietro and Fortunato explain it is a former temple of Venus and say there are legends about people who have been tempted by spirits there.

== Themes ==
Eichendorff's target in The Marble Statue was the tendency in Romanticism to treat art as a religion. He used the statue of Venus to represent an allure that leads to the rejection of life and real people.

The Marble Statue is seen a modern adaptation of the traditional Venusberg myth, in which Venus lures men through her beauty, causing them to lead sinful lives, for which they usually fall victim to damnation.

== Publication history ==
The Marble Statue was first published in the autumn of 1818 as part of Johann Leonhard Schrag's Frauentaschenbuch für das Jahr 1819 (lit. 'Women's pocket book for the year 1819'). In 1826 it was published in a volume with Echendorff's novella Memoirs of a Good-for-Nothing and a number of his poems.

== Reception ==
When The Marble Statue first was published, it was criticised for being too fantastical, fragmented and confusing. In the 20th century it was criticised for being rigid and for presenting a black and white conflict between redeeming Christianity and damnable paganism. In the late 20th century this was reevaluated and critics have pointed to the ambiguity of overlapping Christian and pagan elements and how the sexual imagery subverts the supposed moralistic message of the story.

== Adaptations ==
- The 1922 opera Venus by Othmar Schoeck is based on both The Marble Statue and Prosper Mérimée's short story "La Vénus d'Ille".

== See also ==
- List of gothic fiction works
