= Elegie (Schoeck) =

German composer

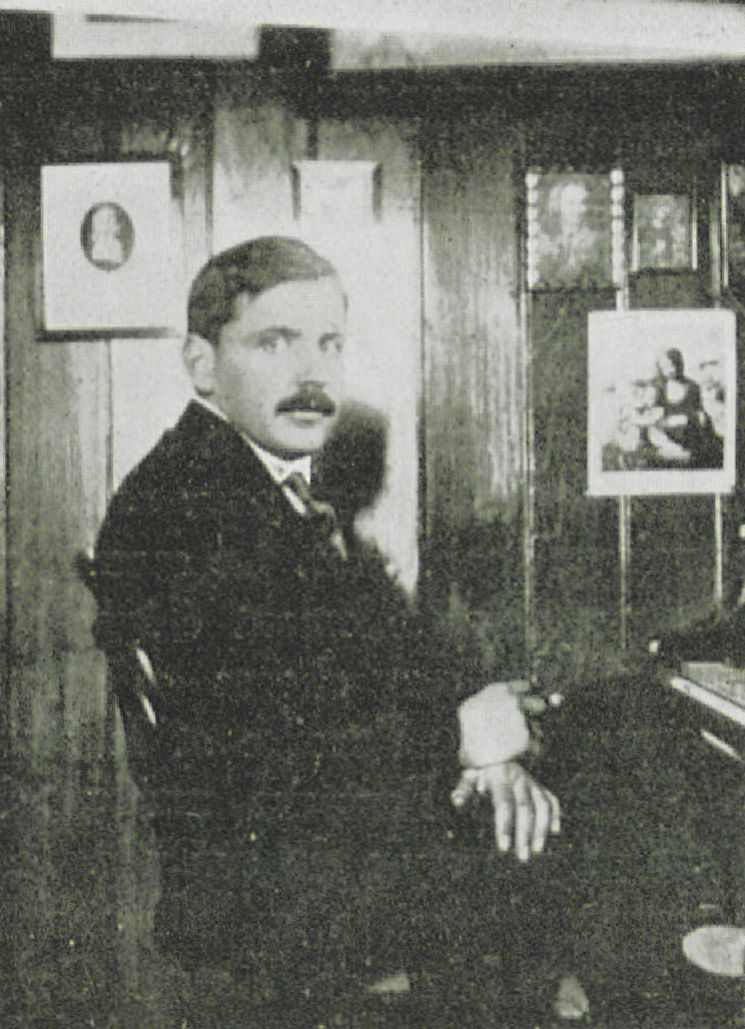
Othmar Schoeck (1917)

Elegie, Op.36 is a 1922 song cycle for baritone and chamber orchestra by Othmar Schoeck. The cycle consists of 24 German-language settings of Nikolaus Lenau and Joseph Freiherr von Eichendorff. The Elegie is the earliest of Schoeck's song-cycles, coming after his opera Venus (1919–21).

== Structure ==
The Elegie consists of the following poems:

1. Wehmut (Eichendorff)
2. Liebesfrühling (Lenau)
3. Stille Sicherheit (Lenau)
4. Frage nicht (Lenau)
5. Warnung und Wunsch (Lenau)
6. Zweifelnder Wunsch (Lenau)
7. Waldlied (Lenau)
8. Waldgang (Lenau)
9. An den Wind (Lenau)
10. Kommen und Scheiden (Lenau)
11. Vesper (Eichendorff)
12. Herbstklage (Lenau)
13. Herbstgefühl (Lenau)
14. Nachklang (Eichendorf)
15. Herbstgefühl (Lenau)
16. Das Mondlicht (Lenau)
17. Vergangenheit (Lenau)
18. Waldlied (Lenau)
19. Herbstentschluss (Lenau)
20. Verlorenes Glück (Lenau)
21. Angedenken (Eichendorff)
22. Welke Rose (Lenau)
23. Dichterlos (Eichendorff)
24. Der Einsame (Eichendorff)

== Recordings ==
- Peter Lagger, Camerata Zürich, cond. Räto Tschupp, 1975
- Arthur Loosli, Berner Kammerensemble, cond. Theo Hug, Jecklin
- Klaus Mertens, Mutare Ensemble, Gerhard Müller-Hornbach, NCA 2003
- Andreas Schmidt, Musikkollegium Winterthur, cond. Werner Andreas Albert, CPO
- Christian Gerhaher, Kammerorchester Basel, cond. Heinz Holliger, Sony, 2022.
