= Christian Gerhaher =

German opera singer

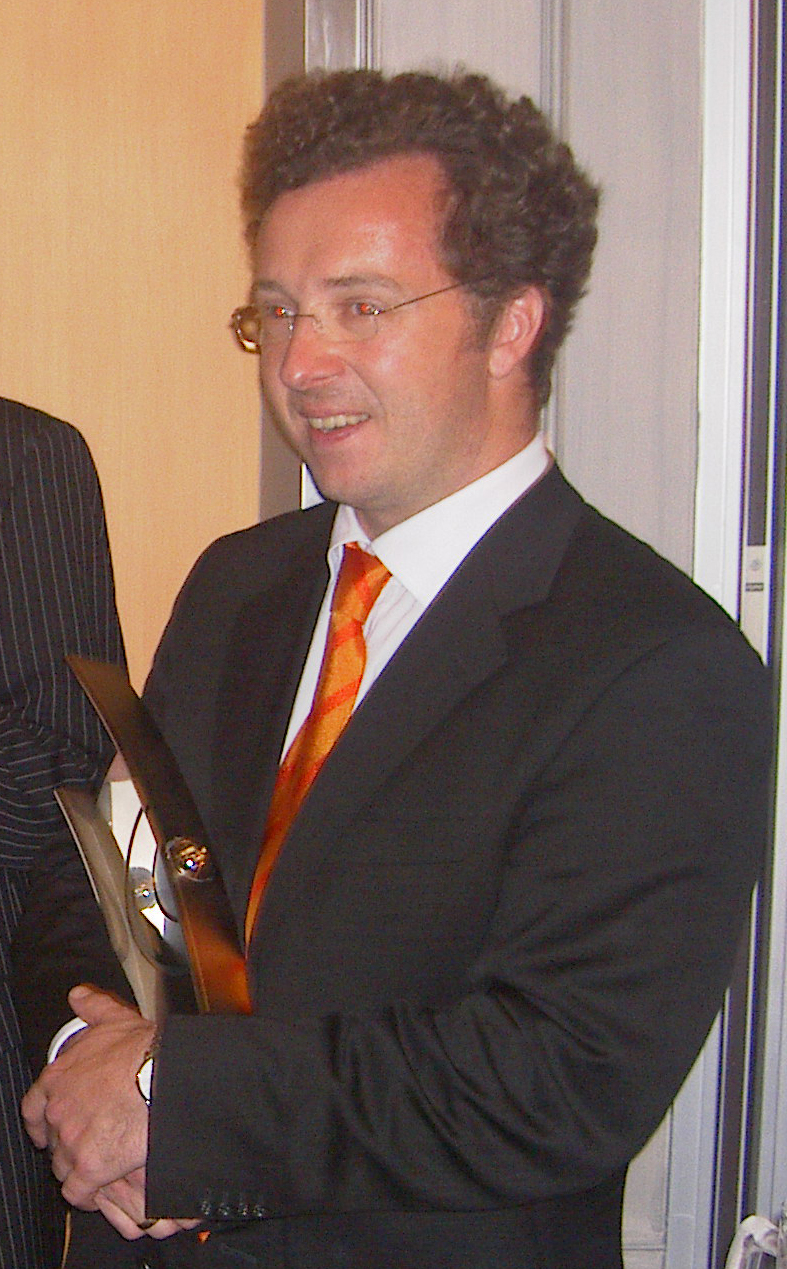
- The baritone in 2004, receiving the Echo award
- Born: 24 July 1969 (age 57); Straubing, Germany
- Education: Hochschule für Musik und Theater München
- Occupations: Classical baritone singer; Professor
- Awards: Rheingau Musik Preis (2009); Midem special prize (2010); Laurence Olivier Award for Outstanding Achievement in Opera (2011)

Christian Gerhaher (born 24 July 1969, in Straubing) is a German baritone and bass singer in opera and concert, particularly known as a Lieder singer.

== Career ==
Christian Gerhaher studied with Paul Kuën and Raimund Grumbach at the Hochschule für Musik und Theater München, and Lied with Friedemann Berger, already together with his accompanist for decades to come, Gerold Huber. He took master classes with Dietrich Fischer-Dieskau (whose voice Gerhaher's remarkably resembles), Elisabeth Schwarzkopf and Inge Borkh.

He was a member of the opera in Würzburg from 1998 to 2000, performing in Thomas Hengelbrock's production of Così fan tutte, in Weber's Der Freischütz with the Cappella Coloniensis, and Papageno in Achim Freyer's staging of The Magic Flute. a role that he sang as his debut at the Salzburg Festival in 2006. In 2005 he portrayed the title role of Monteverdi's L'Orfeo at the Oper Frankfurt where he appeared as Wolfram in Wagner's Tannhäuser in 2007.

In concert he has collaborated with Helmuth Rilling, Nikolaus Harnoncourt, Neville Marriner, Philippe Herreweghe, Heinz Holliger and Trevor Pinnock, among others.

Gerhaher has performed and recorded Lieder with pianist Gerold Huber, such as Schubert's Winterreise, Die schöne Müllerin, Schwanengesang and Gesänge des Harfners. His Schubert album Abendbilder with Gerold Huber won a Gramophone Award for Solo vocal in 2006. More songs with piano or chamber ensemble have included Brahms' Vier ernste Gesänge and Martin's Jedermann Monologues, Mahler's Lieder eines fahrenden Gesellen and Kindertotenlieder. He participated in the project Terezín / Theresienstadt of Anne Sofie von Otter to record songs written in the concentration camp of Terezín. Supported by her pianist Bengt Forsberg (also accordion, guitar and double bass) and his, Gerold Huber, Bebe Risenfors (accordion, guitar), Ib Hausmann (clarinet), Philip Dukes (viola), Josephine Knight (cello) and Daniel Hope (violin) they perform music written in the concentration camp by the artists Ilse Weber, Karel Švenk, Adolf Strauss, Martin Roman, Hans Krása, Carlo S. Taube, Viktor Ullmann and Pavel Haas.

With Rilling and his Gächinger Kantorei he appeared at the 70th birthday concert in 2003 and recorded Bach's Mass in B minor and Christmas Oratorio and Britten's War Requiem, among others.

In 2009, he was awarded the Rheingau Musik Preis of the Rheingau Musik Festival. He appeared at the festival in 2010 with Gerold Huber to celebrate Gustav Mahler's 150th birthday, singing Sieben Lieder aus letzter Zeit (Seven Songs of Latter Days) and from Das Lied von der Erde the movements Der Einsame im Herbst (The lonely one in Autumn) and Der Abschied (The Farewell). In 2011 they performed the composer's Lieder eines fahrenden Gesellen, Des Knaben Wunderhorn and Kindertotenlieder.

In 2010, he was awarded the Midem special prize "male vocalist".

He had his debut at Covent Garden London in 2010 in Richard Wagner's opera Tannhäuser and received the Laurence Olivier Award for Outstanding Achievement in Opera for his performance as Wolfram in March 2011.

He is a professor in the Hochschule für Musik und Theater, München.

== Selected recordings ==
- Franz Schubert: Winterreise, piano: Gerold Huber, RCA Sony BMG, January 2001
- Johannes Brahms: Vier ernste Gesänge, Franz Schubert: Gesänge des Harfners and various Lieder, Frank Martin: Sechs Monologe aus Jedermann, piano: Gerold Huber, Arte Nova, August 2002
- Gustav Mahler: Kindertotenlieder, piano: Gerold Huber, Lieder eines fahrenden Gesellen, Hyperion Ensemble, Arte Nova, February 2003
- Joseph Haydn: Die Schöpfung, Concentus Musicus Wien, Arnold Schoenberg Chor, Dorothea Röschmann, Michael Schade, conductor Nikolaus Harnoncourt, harmonia mundi, February 2004
- Robert Schumann: Dichterliebe und gemischte Lieder, piano: Gerold Huber, RCA, October 2004
- Carl Orff: Carmina Burana, Berliner Philharmoniker, conductor Simon Rattle, EMI, 2005
- Felix Mendelssohn: Elias, Leipzig Gewandhaus Orchestra, conductor Herbert Blomstedt, RCA, Juli 2005
- Schubert: Abendbilder (various Lieder), piano: Gerold Huber, RCA, January 2006
- Mendelssohn: Die Heimkehr aus der Fremde, part of Kauz, Stuttgart Radio Symphony Orchestra, conductor Helmuth Rilling, hänssler classic, 2006
- Haydn: Orlando paladino, part of Rodomonte, Concentus musicus, conductor Nikolaus Harnoncourt, harmonia mundi, May 2006
- Wolfgang Amadeus Mozart: Die Zauberflöte, part of Papageno, Wiener Philharmoniker, conductor Riccardo Muti, Decca, 2006
- Johann Sebastian Bach: Mass in B minor, Gächinger Kantorei, Bach-Collegium Stuttgart, conductor Helmuth Rilling, hänssler classic, 2007
- Bach: Christmas Oratorio, Concentus Musicus Wien, Arnold Schoenberg Chor, conductor Nikolaus Harnoncourt, harmonia mundi, November 2007
- Terezín / Theresienstadt, Lieder by Victor Ullmann and others, Anne Sofie von Otter, Deutsche Grammophon, 2007
- Schumann: Melancholie – Liederkreis op. 39 und gemischte Lieder, piano: Gerold Huber, RCA, March 2008
- Schumann: Das Paradies und die Peri, Symphonieorchester des Bayerischen Rundfunks, conductor Nikolaus Harnoncourt, RCA, March 2008
- Benjamin Britten: War Requiem, Annette Dasch, James Taylor, conductor Helmuth Rilling, hänssler classic, September 2008
- Mahler: Das Lied von der Erde, Montreal Symphony Orchestra, Klaus Florian Vogt, conductor Kent Nagano, Sony Music, April 2009
- Karl Amadeus Hartmann, Des Simplicius Simplicissimus Jugend, Symphonieorchester des Bayerischen Rundfunks, conductor: Ulf Schirmer, September 2009
- Haydn: Die Jahreszeiten, Concentus Musicus Wien, Arnold Schoenberg Chor, conductor Nikolaus Harnoncourt, harmonia mundi, March 2009
- Schumann: Szenen aus Goethes Faust, Royal Concertgebouw Orchestra, conductor Nikolaus Harnoncourt, RCO live, July 2009
- Othmar Schoeck: Notturno, Rosamunde Quartett, ECM, September 2009
- Mahler: Lieder, piano: Gerold Huber, Sony Music, October 2009
- Othmar Schoeck: Elegie, Op. 36, Sony Music, April 2022
- Mahler: Das Lied von der Erde, Sony Classical, May 2023

== Recent albums ==
Year	Title	Label
2017	Brahms: Die Schöne Magelone	Sony Classical
2017	Debussy: Pelléas et Melisand	Sony Classical
2017	Schubert: Die schöne Müllerin, D.795	Sony Classical
2018	Schumann: Frage	Sony Classical
2021	Schumann: Alle Lieder	Sony Classical
2022	Othmar Schoeck: Elegie, Op. 36	Sony Classical
2023	Mahler: Das Lied von der Erde	Sony Classical
