= Theresienstadt (disambiguation) =

Theresienstadt was a Nazi concentration camp in German-occupied Czechoslovakia.

Theresienstadt may also refer to:

- Terezín or Theresienstadt, a former military fortress in the Ústí nad Labem Region of the Czech Republic
- Theresienstadt family camp, a section of Auschwitz II-Birkenau where some prisoners deported from Theresienstadt to Auschwitz were held
- Theresienstadt Small Fortress (1940–1945), a former prison of the Habsburg empire and later the Gestapo
- Theresienstadt (1944 film), a Nazi propaganda film about the Theresienstadt camp
- Terezín - Theresienstadt, a 2007 recital album by mezzo-soprano Anne Sofie von Otter
- Terézváros or Theriesenstadt, a district of Budapest
