= La Vénus d'Ille =

Fantasy short story about Venus

- Short story by Prosper Mérimée

Text available at Wikisource
- Country: France
- Language: French
- Genres: Fantasy, horror

Publication
- Published in: 1835
- Publication date: 1837

"La Vénus d'Ille" ([la venys dij], "The Venus of Ille") is a short story by French writer Prosper Mérimée. It was written in 1835 and published in 1837. It tells the story of a statue of Venus that comes to life and kills the son of its owner, whom it believes to be its husband. This is based on a popular medieval story, of which William of Malmesbury wrote the earliest known version.

== Plot summary ==
The narrator, an archeologist, is visiting the town of Ille in the Languedoc-Roussillon region of France. A friend of his recommends him to M. de Peyrehorade, who is familiar with the Roman ruins in the area. When he arrives, he discovers that M. de Peyrehorade's son, Alphonse, is to be married to a certain Mademoiselle de Puygarrig, and the narrator is invited to the wedding.

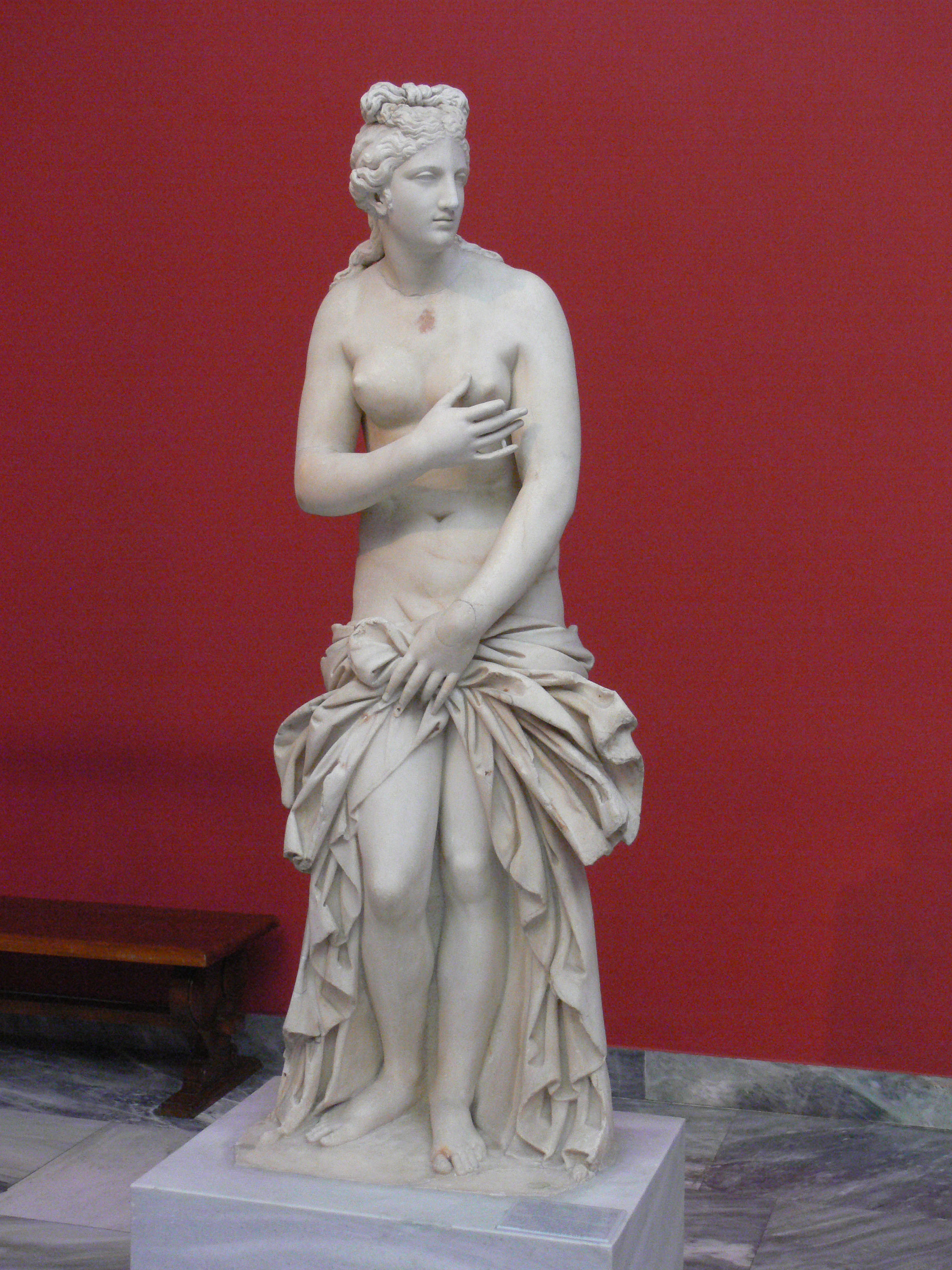
A marble statue of Venus similar to the bronze described in Prosper Mérimée's Vénus d'Ille

Meanwhile, M. de Peyrehorade shows the narrator his new discovery: a bronze statue of Venus Pudica. The narrator judges the statue to be very old and deciphers the inscription. Both men marvel at her fierce gaze; she is as frightening as she is beautiful.

Before the wedding, the groom decides to play a game of paume, and he slips the wedding ring intended for his fiancée onto a finger of the statue. He wins the game, but his opponent swears revenge. He accidentally leaves the ring with the statue; and when he goes back later to retrieve it, he discovers that the statue has closed her fingers around it. The narrator does not believe Alphonse's story, since Alphonse has been drinking heavily at the reception, and he goes to bed.

During the night, the narrator hears heavy footsteps climbing the stairs; but he assumes that it is a drunken Alphonse going to bed. In the morning, after the cock's crow, he hears the same steps retreating down the stairs. Suddenly, there is screaming and commotion. The narrator runs down the hall to find a crowd of people surrounding the dead Alphonse, who looks as though he died in a fiery embrace.

At first, he suspects that it was the rival faction from the game of Paume; but later he hears the story of Alphonse's wife, who others claim has gone crazy. She says that the statue entered the room, embraced her husband, and spent the entire night with him in her arms. In the morning, the statue left him there and returned to her pedestal.

The narrator leaves town to return to Paris. He later hears that M. de Peyrehorade has died, and his wife had the statue melted down and turned into a bell for the local church. The narrator remarks that since the bell has been installed, the crops have been destroyed twice by frost.

== Characters ==
- The narrator, an archeologist from Paris on vacation in Ille
- M. de Peyrehorade, the owner of the statue
- Mme de Peyrehorade, M. de Peyrehorade's wife
- Alphonse, M. de Peyrehorade's son
- Mlle de Puygarrig, Alphonse's fiancée and later wife
- Venus, the cursed statue
- le Catalan

== Adaptations ==
The Swiss composer Othmar Schoeck drew on the story for his 1922 opera Venus as well as on the similar novella The Marble Statue (Das Marmorbild) by German writer Joseph von Eichendorff.

In 1931, the story was adapted as "The Bronze Venus", a 30-minute episode of the radio show The Witch's Tale. It was also adapted as a 60-minute episode of an Italian TV anthology series called The Devil's Games. It was directed by famed Italian horror film director Mario Bava, with his son Lamberto Bava co-directing. The TV episode was never dubbed in English. It was also adapted into the Guy Maddin film Twilight of the Ice Nymphs. In 1967, director Janusz Majewski, who would later adapt Mérimée's novella Lokis as a feature film, directed a 22-minute-long, black-and-white television adaptation of La Vénus d'Ille, titled Wenus z Ille (The Venus of Ille).
