= Notturno (Schoeck) =

Song cycle

Notturno (German: Notturno: Fünf Sätze für Bariton und Streichquartett) is a song cycle for baritone and string quartet by Swiss composer Othmar Schoeck (1886–1957). It was composed between 1931 and 1933, and was published as his Op. 47.

It consists of musical settings of nine poems by the Austrian poet Nikolaus Lenau (1802–1850) and of one by the Swiss poet Gottfried Keller (1819–1890). It is in 14 sections: the German title Fünf Sätze (i.e. "Five pieces", or "movements") refers to the fact that the vocal settings fall into five groups, four of poems by Lenau and one of the poem by Keller, separated by instrumental interludes.

1. "Sieh dort den Berg mit seinem Wiesenhange" (Lenau)
2. "Sieh hier den Bach, anbei die Waldesrose" (Lenau)
3. Andante appassionato (string quartet alone)
4. "Die dunklen Wolken hingen" (Lenau)
5. "Sahst du ein Glück vorübergehn" (Lenau)
6. Presto (string quartet alone)
7. "Der Traum war so wild" (Lenau)
8. "Es weht der Wind so kühl" (Lenau)
9. "Rings ein Verstummen, ein Entfärben" (Lenau)
10. "Ach, wer möchte einsam trinken" (Lenau)
11. Allegretto (string quartet alone)
12. "O Einsamkeit! wie trink' ich gerne" (Lenau)
13. Allegretto tranquillo (string quartet alone)
14. "Heerwagen, mächtig Sternbild der Germanen" (Keller)

The cycle is late romantic in style, dark, chromatic and expressionist in character. It falls into five sections: Ruhig, a nature scene, on the death of love; Presto, a nightmare; Unruhig bewegt, memories of a dead friend; Ruhig und leise, birds and nature remind the poet of the death of a friend; Rasch und kräftig, quasi recit., the poet seeks solitude, looks to the stars, and begs for rest.

According to Schoeck's biographer Chris Walton, Alban Berg had words of praise for Notturno. The work was premiered in 1933. It remained almost unnoticed until 1967, when Dietrich Fischer-Dieskau and the Juilliard Quartet introduced it to New York. Critic Miles Kastendieck wrote that, "Notturno stems from Mahler", and that the work evidenced "a surprisingly sustained melodic strength. ... Schoeck communicated something of himself, so that frequently at the end of a song he fashioned its cadence quite beautifully. Thus his final evocation achieved a tranquility most sensitively expressed". The same artists made the premier recording, in 1968. Music critic Alex Ross has described the final section, in which the poet addresses the Heerwagen (army wagon, the constellation Ursa Major), as "wrenchingly beautiful".

A typical performance takes about 38 minutes.

== Discography ==
- 1968: Juilliard Quartet and Dietrich Fischer-Dieskau (Columbia Records)
- 1980: Berner Streichquartett with Niklaus Tüller (Accord)
- 1989: Amati Quartett with Kurt Widmer (Atlantis)
- 1992: Cherubini Quartet with Dietrich Fischer-Dieskau (EMI Classics)
- 1995: Quatuor Stanislas with François Le Roux (Gallo)
- 1995: Carmina Quartett with Olaf Bär (Denon)
- 2003: Minguet Quartett with Klaus Mertens (New Classical Adventure)
- 2009: Rosamunde Quartett with Christian Gerhaher (ECM Records GmbH)
- 2013: Leipziger Streichquartett with Stephan Genz (MDG Gold)
