= Aviva Bar-On =

Czech-Israeli Holocaust survivor (born 1932)

Aviva Bar-On (Hebrew: אביבה בר-און; formerly Bedřiška Winklerová; born September 2, 1932) is a Czech-Israeli Holocaust survivor.

== Biography ==
Aviva Bar-On was born as Bedřiška Winklerová in a Jewish family on September 2, 1932, in Miroslav, Czechoslovakia. Her parents were Josef and Adele Winkle. Her father ran a sawmill, and he was also an educator. She had a brother, Felix. After the occupation of the Sudetenland in 1938, the family fled to Brno, where they lived with their uncle and his family. Her father had to do forced labor at the construction of a railway line. In January 1942 the family had to go to a collection point in Brno and were deported to Theresienstadt Ghetto. The family was separated here and Aviva Bar-On was allowed to stay with her mother. When Aviva Bar-On fell ill in Theresienstadt, she met the writer and composer Ilse Weber in the infirmary, who repeatedly sang a "sad but funny song" to the sick children in the concentration camp. After she was released from the infirmary, she visited Ilse Weber again and again and learned her lyrics and melodies.

Since Bar-On's father was an educator, he and his family were protected from deportation. In February 1945, when the collapsing Hitler regime needed foreign currency, 1,200 Jews from the Theresienstadt concentration camp were sold for a million dollars. Bar-On's father was summoned by the camp commandant Karl Rahm, who, since his father was a master builder, selected him for the transport to Switzerland. The family believed until the crossing over the border that the transport was going to Auschwitz, but they arrived safely in Kreuzlingen on February 7, 1945. First on to St. Gallen, where they were quarantined, from there to Adliswil near Zürich and finally they were accommodated in a hotel on Lake Geneva near Montreux. While none of their friends from Theresienstadt could survive, the Winkler family was safe and could wait for the fall of the Third Reich.

In July 1945 the family returned to Czechoslovakia. The apartment in Miroslav had been confiscated, the parents were looking for new accommodation, while the children went to Prague. Here Aviva Bar-On and her brother came to sanatoriums, Bar-On suffered from bulimia. After she was released from the sanatorium, she went to school for two more years, first in Miroslav, then in Brno.

In May 1949, Aviva Bar-On and her brother took the last chance to leave their homeland legally and emigrated to Israel with the support of the organization Youth Aliyah. First she lived in kibbutz Kabri in the north of Israel, then trained as a nurse at the Rambam Hospital in Haifa and finally studied sociology. In 1956 she married Asher Braun (Bar-On), who comes from Hungary and who had survived the Mauthausen concentration camp and a death march. Bedřiška Winklerová changed its name to Aviva Bar-On. In 1956 the brother went to study in England, but stayed there. The parents originally wanted to follow their children to Israel, but this was not possible in the 1950s, and later their father no longer wanted, who ultimately died in Czechoslovakia. After his death, his mother came to Israel in 1976, where she lived for 19 years, but no longer learned Hebrew. Aviva Bar-On lives in Kirjat Ono near Tel Aviv.

After over nearly 30 years tracking down thousands of songs, symphonies and operas composed by Nazi concentration camp victims, the Jewish Italian composer Francesco Lotoro conducted a concert in Jerusalem on April 15, 2018. The concert took place on the occasion of Independence Day (Yom haAtzma'ut) and the 70th anniversary of the founding of the state of Israel and included works by Max Ehrlich, Willy Rosen and Zygfryd Maciej Stryjecki. At 85, Aviva Bar-On also performed and presented a song by Ilse Weber who died in 1944 in the gas chamber of Auschwitz, the text and melody of which were not handed down in writing, but through Aviva's memory.

== Personal life ==
Aviva Bar-On has three children, eleven grandchildren and already several great-grandchildren.

== Quotation ==
"The fact that I overcame the difficulties of childhood and youth, and yet I managed to build a wonderful family, is my greatest success. We never talked about the Shoah at home until very late. The children grew up here with a straight spine. [...] Our children have grown into equal citizens of our country."

— Aviva Bar-On, interview by Hynek Moravec at Kirjat Ono on April 4, 2014
