= Vítkovice (Ostrava) =

- City district of Ostrava
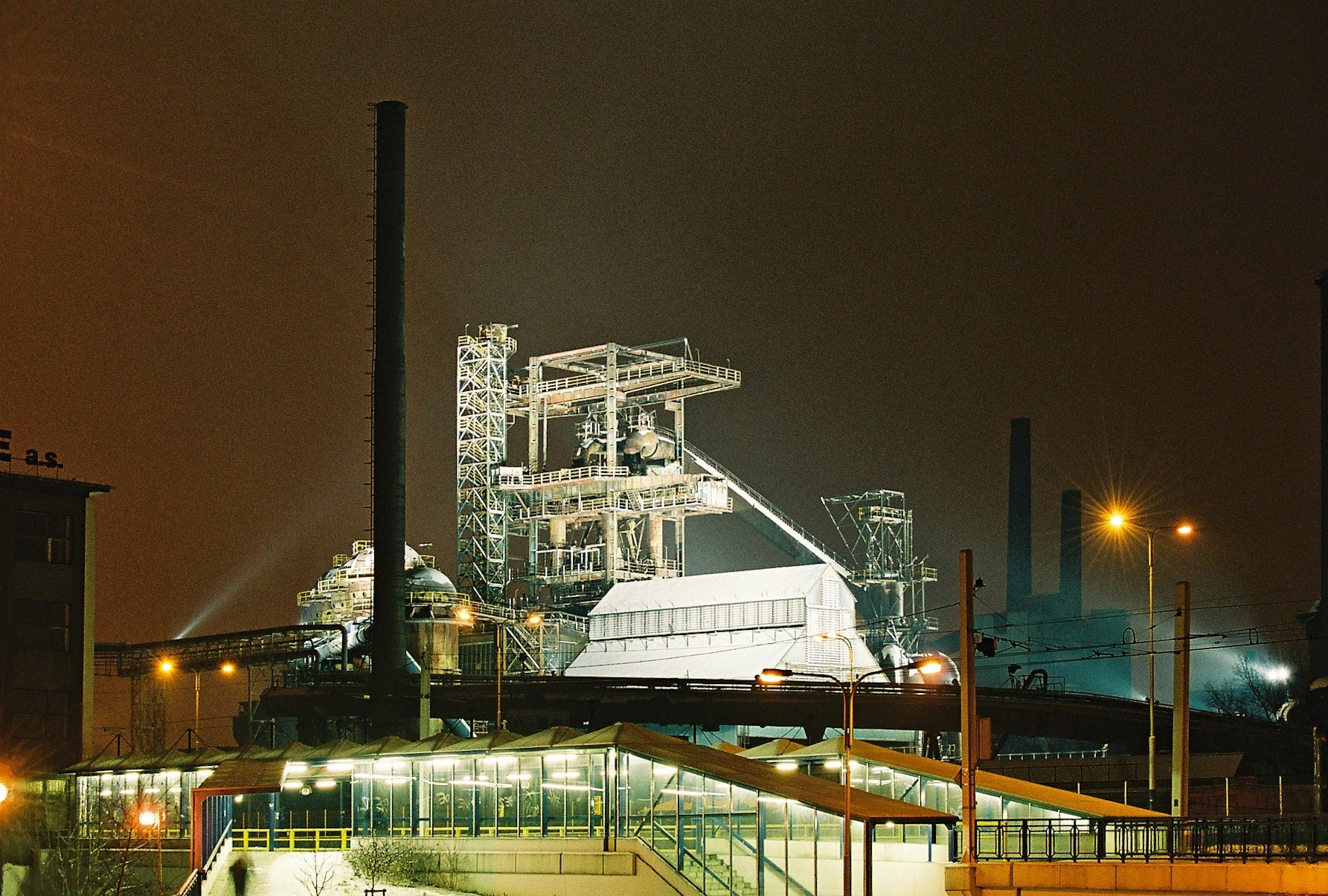
- Blast furnaces of Vítkovice Iron and Steel Works

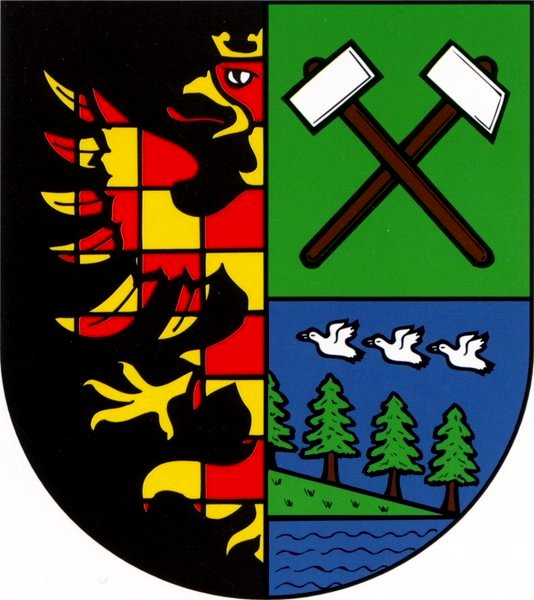
- Flag Coat of arms

- Location of Vítkovice in Ostrava
- Coordinates: 49°48′56″N 18°16′0″E
- Country: Czech Republic
- Region: Moravia-Silesia
- District: Ostrava-City
- City: Ostrava

Government
  - Mayor: Richard Čermák (Ostravak)

Area
  - Total: 6.48 km^{2} (2.50 sq mi)

Population (2021)
  - Total: 7,653
  - Density: 1,180/km^{2} (3,060/sq mi)
- Time zone: UTC+1 (CET)
  - Summer (DST): UTC+2 (CEST)
- Postal code: 703 00
- Website: http://www.vitkovice.ostrava.cz/

Vítkovice (German: Witkowitz, Polish: Witkowice) is an administrative district of the city of Ostrava, capital of the Moravian-Silesian Region in the Czech Republic. Situated on the left bank of the Ostravice River in the Moravian part of the city, Vítkovice was a town in its own right until its incorporation in 1924.

== History ==
The settlement of Witchendorff in the March of Moravia was first mentioned in a 1357 deed by the Lords of Paskov, probably named after the nobleman Witek von Wigstein, who was enfeoffed by the Bishops of Olomouc with nearby Šostýn (Schauenstein) Castle in 1369. In 1435 it was given in pawn with the Lordship of Hukvaldy by Emperor Sigismund to the former Hussite leader Nikolaus Sokol of Lamberg.

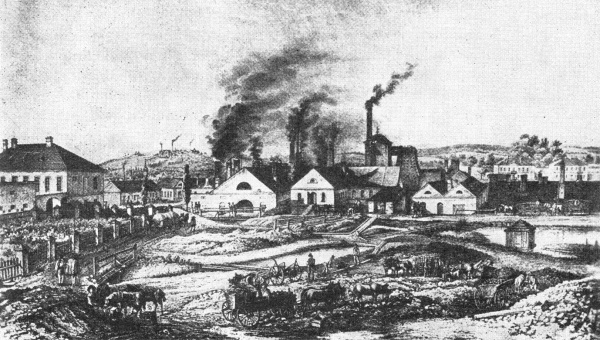
Vítkovice steel mill, mid 19th century

Vítkovice, initially agricultural village, witnessed heavy industrialization after 1828, when the Olomouc archbishop Archduke Rudolf of Austria at the instigation of geologist Franz Xaver Riepl had an iron and steel mill (Rudolfshütte) built, the first in the Austrian Empire to use the puddling technique. Since then the village became an important industrial center of the region.

The iron works were continuously enlarged and finally purchased by the Viennese banker Salomon Mayer von Rothschild in 1843. He also financed the extension of the Emperor Ferdinand Northern Railway from Vienna to Ostrava with a branch-off to his steel mill, which was completed in 1855. His Rothschild heirs in 1873 founded the Witkowitzer Bergbau- und Hüttengewerkschaft, the largest iron and steel works in the Austro-Hungarian Monarchy. During the German occupation of Czechoslovakia their possessions were "aryanized" and taken over by the Reichswerke Hermann Göring conglomerate. At the ironworks, the German administration operated a forced labour "education" camp, and a subcamp of a forced labour "education" camp from Moravská Ostrava. After the war they were socialised as the Vítkovické železárny Klement Gottwald n.p. (VŽKG) by the Czechoslovak state.

Vítkovice from 1850 was an independent municipality. In 1908 it was granted town rights by Emperor Franz Joseph I of Austria, in 1924 it became a part of Greater Ostrava.

== Demographics ==
Historical population

Year	Pop.	±%
1869	1,677	—
1880	2,591	+54.5%
1890	10,294	+297.3%
1900	19,123	+85.8%
1910	23,151	+21.1%

Year	Pop.	±%
1921	27,358	+18.2%
1930	25,820	−5.6%
1950	20,774	−19.5%
1961	16,907	−18.6%
1970	10,116	−40.2%

Year	Pop.	±%
1980	9,555	−5.5%
1991	7,292	−23.7%
2001	7,518	+3.1%
2011	6,916	−8.0%
2021	7,653	+10.7%

Source: Censuses

== Sights ==
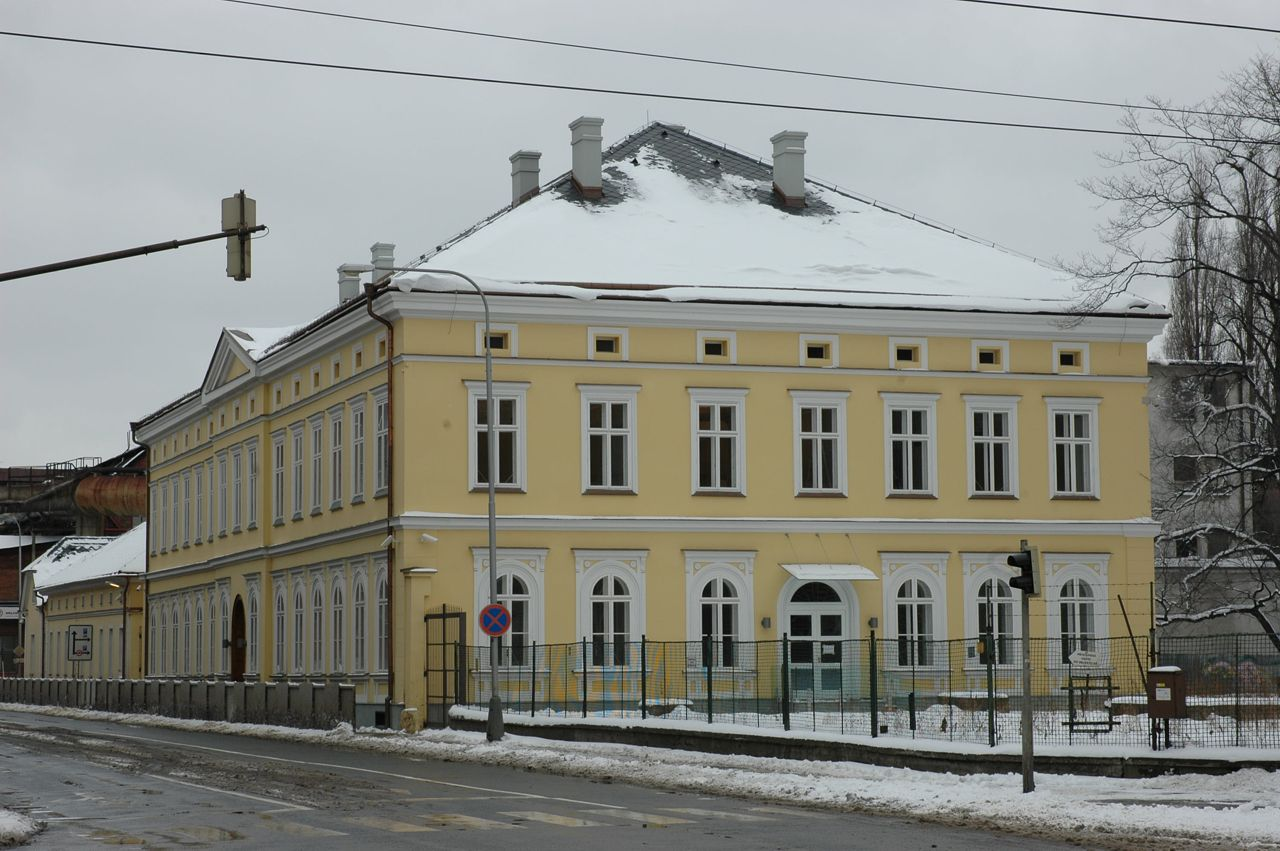
Rothschild Palace

The most important landmarks of Vítkovice are:

- Neo-Gothic Saint Paul Church, built in 1880-1886.
- Rothschild Palace, built in 1846/47, was an Empire-style building and the palace was the original seat of the owners of the steel works.
- Vítkovice Town Hall, built in 1901/02, has been part of the Vítkovice Iron and Steel Works since 2002 and is designated a National Cultural Landmark.
- The FC Vítkovice football club is based in this part of the city. The ice hockey club HC Vítkovice is located nearby but is based in the neighbouring district of Ostrava-Jih, despite its name.

== Notable people ==
- Ilse Weber (1903-1944), writer, murdered in Auschwitz.
- Leopold Ludwig (1908-1979), conductor
- Beno Blachut (1913-1985), operatic tenor
- Bedřich Geminder, Czechoslovak communist executed during the Slánský show trial
- Nikola Ristanovski, Macedonian actor
