= Miroslav (Znojmo District) =

- Town
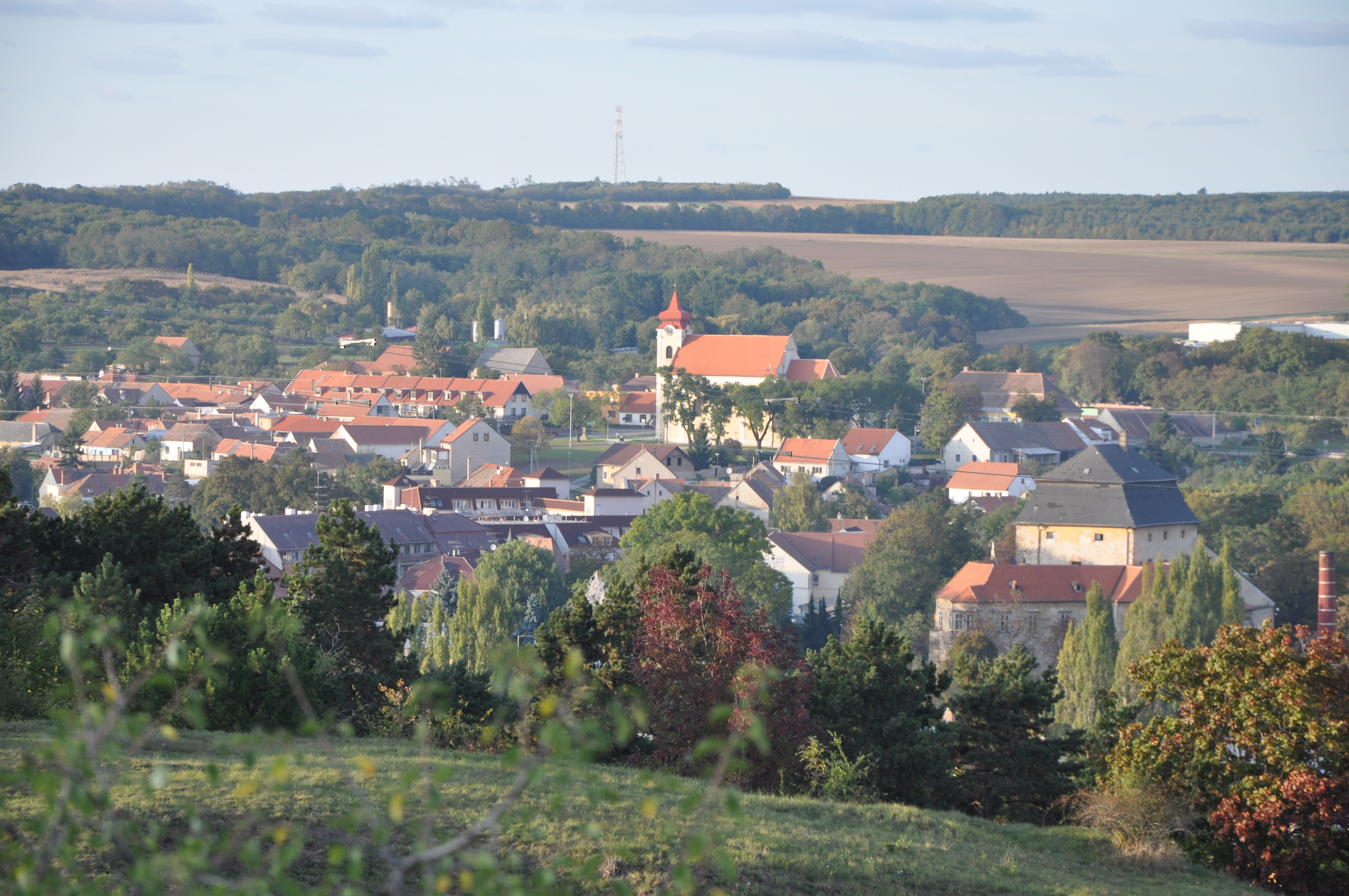
- Panorama of Miroslav

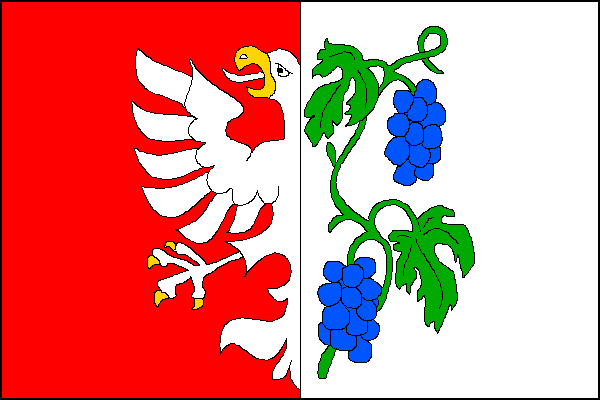
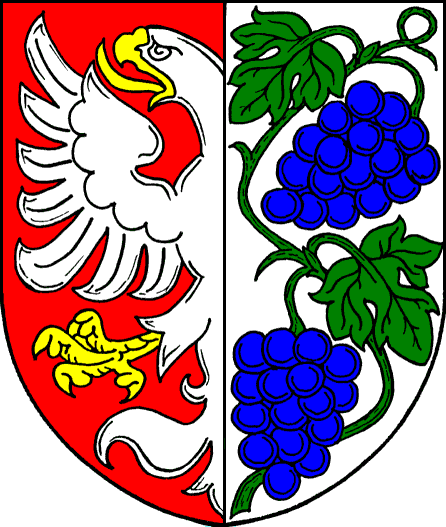
- Flag Coat of arms

- Location in the Czech Republic
- Coordinates: 48°56′52″N 16°18′45″E
- Country: Czech Republic
- Region: South Moravian
- District: Znojmo
- First mentioned: 1222

Government
  - Mayor: Martin Plechatý

Area
  - Total: 26.60 km^{2} (10.27 sq mi)
- Elevation: 260 m (850 ft)

Population (2026-01-01)
  - Total: 3,019
  - Density: 113.5/km^{2} (294.0/sq mi)
- Time zone: UTC+1 (CET)
  - Summer (DST): UTC+2 (CEST)
- Postal code: 671 72
- Website: www.mesto-miroslav.cz

Miroslav (Czech pronunciation: [ˈmɪroslaf]; German: Mißlitz) is a town in Znojmo District in the South Moravian Region of the Czech Republic. It has about 3,100 inhabitants.

== Administrative division ==
Miroslav consists of two municipal parts (in brackets population according to the 2021 census):

- Miroslav (2,835)
- Kašenec (146)

== Geography ==
Miroslav is located about 21 kilometres (13 mi) northeast of Znojmo and 33 km (21 mi) southwest of Brno. It lies on the border between the Bobrava Highlands and Dyje–Svratka Valley. The highest point is located on the slopes of the hill Kadavá hora at 360 m (1,181 ft) above sea level. Seven discontinuous areas on the hills south of the town form the Miroslavské kopce National Nature Monument.

== History ==
The first written mention of Miroslav is from 1222. In 1533, during the rule of the noble family Valecký of Mírov (between 1497 and 1569), the village was promoted to a market town. In 1965, it became a town.

The town had a significant Jewish population. After the Jews were expelled from Brno and Znojmo in 1454, many of then came into Miroslav. The community disappeared as a result of the Holocaust in the World War II.

== Demographics ==
Historical population

| Year | Pop. | ±% |
|---|---|---|
| 1869 | 3,017 | — |
| 1880 | 3,097 | +2.7% |
| 1890 | 3,267 | +5.5% |
| 1900 | 3,487 | +6.7% |
| 1910 | 3,672 | +5.3% |

| Year | Pop. | ±% |
|---|---|---|
| 1921 | 3,504 | −4.6% |
| 1930 | 3,873 | +10.5% |
| 1950 | 2,389 | −38.3% |
| 1961 | 2,747 | +15.0% |
| 1970 | 2,720 | −1.0% |

| Year | Pop. | ±% |
|---|---|---|
| 1980 | 2,926 | +7.6% |
| 1991 | 3,036 | +3.8% |
| 2001 | 3,010 | −0.9% |
| 2011 | 2,862 | −4.9% |
| 2021 | 2,981 | +4.2% |

Source: Censuses

== Economy ==
Miroslav is known for viticulture and apricot growing.

== Transport ==
The I/53 road from Znojmo to Pohořelice runs through the southern part of the municipal territory.

Miroslav is located on the railway line Brno–Hrušovany nad Jevišovkou/Šanov.

== Sights ==
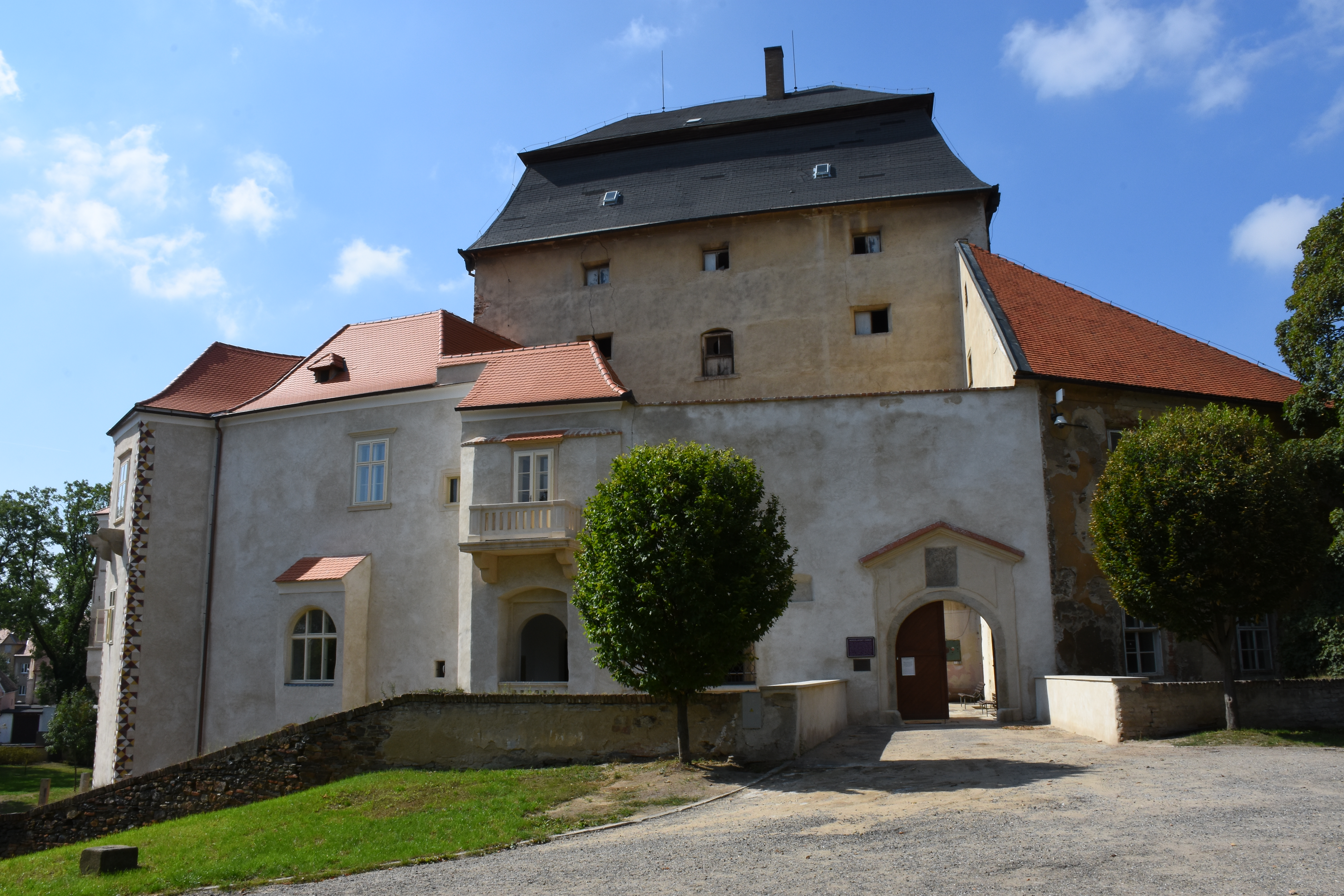
Miroslav Castle

The most important monument is the Miroslav Castle. A Gothic water fortress in Miroslav was first mentioned in 1387. In the 16th century, it was rebuilt and extended into a Renaissance residence. From the 1670s to 1761, Baroque modifications were made, but the castle preserved its Gothic-Renaissance look. Today the castle is owned by the town and is open to the public.

The Church of Saints Peter and Paul was built in the Baroque style in 1722–1729. It is located in the northern part of the town, where the original settlement was established.

== Notable people ==
- Isidor Neumann (1832–1906), Austrian dermatologist
- Jakob Herzog (1842–1915), Austrian writer and journalist
- Aviva Bar-On (born 1932), Czech-Israeli Holocaust survivor
