= Ilse Weber =

Czech composer and writer

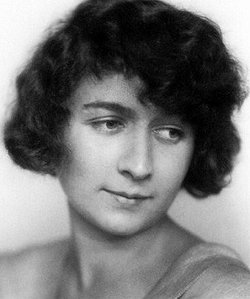
- Born: Ilse Herlinger; 11 January 1903; Witkowitz, Margraviate of Moravia, Austria-Hungary
- Died: 6 October 1944 (aged 41); Auschwitz-Birkenau, German-occupied Poland
- Occupations: Poet and writer
- Known for: German-language songs for Jewish children

Ilse Weber (11 January 1903 – 6 October 1944), née Herlinger, was born in Witkowitz near Mährisch-Ostrau. A Jewish poet, she wrote in German, most notably songs and theater pieces for Jewish children. She married Willi Weber in 1930. She was voluntarily transported to Auschwitz with the children of Theresienstadt and murdered in the gas chambers, along with her son, Tommy. Her most popular book was "Mendel Rosenbusch: Tales for Jewish Children" (1929).

== Life ==
Weber was born on 11 January 1903 in Vítkovice and she learned to speak Czech and German.

Her mother taught her about music and their Jewish religion and her father died when she was ten. Within a few years her writing was being published in the magazine Das Kränzchen.

In 1930 she married Willi Weber. They lived in Vítkovice which was where her family were from. They had a son in about 1931. She wrote in German using her original name of Ilse Herlinger. She had written for children's periodicals and became a producer for Czech Radio. She describes in her letters the changing political atmosphere saying it was like "living on a powder keg". To some extent she said in 1939 that they did not believe "all the rumours"., but following the Nazi occupation of Czechoslovakia in 1939, the Webers were able to get their oldest son, Hanuš, safely to Sweden on a "Kindertransport" before they were confined to Prague's Jewish Ghetto. Hanuš was sent first to the U.K. to live with a friend of his mother who was the daughter of a Swedish diplomat, and he may well be the Hans Weber listed as No. 1292 in the records of the kindertransports to the U.K. organised by Nicholas Winton. He survived the war in Sweden and was reunited with Willi in Prague after the war. He fled Czechoslovakia again in 1968 and returned to Sweden where he lived in Stockholm until his passing in 2021. His son, Tomas, born in 1977, is named in honor of his younger brother, murdered with his mother in Auschwitz.

The Webers arrived at the Theresienstadt concentration camp in February 1942. Ilse Weber worked as a night nurse in the camp's children's infirmary, doing everything she could for the young patients without the aid of medicine (which was forbidden to Jewish prisoners). She wrote around 60 poems during her imprisonment and set many of them to music, employing deceptively simple tunes and imagery to describe the horror of her surroundings. In performance she accompanied herself on guitar. Her songs include "Lullaby," "I Wandered Through Theresienstadt," "The Lidice Sheep," "Wiegala," "And the Rain Falls," and "Avowal of Belief."

When her husband was deported to Auschwitz in October 1944, Ilse Weber volunteered to join him with their son Tommy because she didn't want to break up the family. She and the boy were murdered in the gas chamber on arrival. It was reported that she sang her lullaby to her child as they went to be murdered. Willi Weber survived them by 30 years.

Years later, on April 15, 2018, one of her patients from Theresienstadt, Aviva Bar-On sang, without a written trace and only from memory, one of Ilse Weber's songs during a concert in Jerusalem. The whole event was a tribute to Nazi concentration camp victims who had composed music.

== Writings ==
Her first book was "Mendel Rosenbusch: Tales for Jewish Children" (1929). The title character, a kind elderly man, mysteriously receives a magic coin that enables him to become invisible at will. He uses this power to perform anonymous good deeds for his neighbors. Weber's sharp observations and gentle humor make these stories appealing for all ages.

Her early fiction, dating from 1925, was collected as "The Scooter Race and Other Stories" (1930).

Weber's Theresienstadt poetry was collected in the book "Inside These Walls, Sorrow Lives" (1991). Her songs have been frequently recorded, particularly "Lullaby," most recently by mezzo-soprano Anne Sofie von Otter and Christian Gerhaher (2007). In 2008, the Munich-based publisher Carl Hanser Verlag brought out a collection of her letters and poems entitled: Wann wohl das Leid ein Ende hat (When will the suffering come to an end) collected by the German historian Ulrike Migdal. Weber's surviving son Hanuš participated in a cultural program commemorating his mother's work in Berlin on 22 May 2008. He is the author of a book on her life, Ilse: A Love Story Without a Happy Ending.

Her song "Wiegala" is used in Paula Vogel's play, Indecent.

== Works ==
=== Writing ===
- Märchen (Fairy Tales), 1928
- Die Geschichten um Mendel Rosenbusch: (Mendel Rosenbusch: Tales for Jewish Children), 1929
- Das Trittrollerwettrennen (The Scooter Race), 1936
- In deinen Mauern wohnt das Leid: Gedichte aus dem KZ Theresienstadt (Inside These Walls, Sorrow Lives: Poems from Theresienstadt Concentration Camp), 1991
- Wann wohl das Leid ein Ende hat (When Will Suffering End), 2008; ed. Ulrike Migdal, ISBN 978-3-446-23050-7
- "Dancing on a Powder Keg": Ilse Weber's Letters and Poems; Translated from the German, and foreword by Michal Schwartz, Ruth Bondy on Theresienstadt, Afterword by Ulrike Migdal; Bunim & Bannigan, Ltd, in association with Yad Vashem, 2017, ISBN 978-1-933480-39-8
- „Es war einmal, es ist noch gar nicht lange her“. Erzählungen für Kinder 1928–1935 [includes Jüdische Kindermärchen, Die Geschichten um Mendel Rosenbusch, Das Trittrollerwettrennen and Der blaue Prinz], ed. by Wolfgang Rathert, with a greeting by Daniel Hope and a postface by Theresia Dingelmaier. Hentrich & Hentrich, Leipzig 2023, ISBN 978-3-95565-589-1

== Selected recordings ==
- The Songs of Holocaust : "Und der Regen rinnt". "Wiegala". "Denn alles wird gut". "Dobrý den". "Ade, Kamerad!". "Ukolébavka". "Kleines Wiegenlied" "Ich wandre durch Theresienstadt" Rachel Joselson (soprano), Rene Lecuona (piano), Scott Conklin (violin), Hanna Holman (cello) Albany 2016
- Terezín - Theresienstadt (Anne Sofie von Otter album) "Wiegala" (Lullaby) "Ich wandre durch Theresienstadt" (Wandering Through Theresienstadt) "Ade, Kamerad" (Goodbye, Friend) "Und der Regen rinnt" (And the Rain Falls) Deutsche Grammophon
- complete songs [15 minutes] Ich wand're durch Theresienstadt; Ukolebavka; Dobry den; Wiegenlied; Ade, Kamerad; Und der Regen rinnt: Wiegala; Denn alles wird gut Specials: 8 Lieder von Ilse Weber Timotheus Maas (Bass-Baritone), Johann Jacob Nissen (Guitar ) Label: Ears Love Music, DDD, 2021
