= George Horner (musician) =

Czech-American pianist (1923–2015)

George Horner (15 September 1923 – 23 April 2015) was a Czech-American pianist and cardiopulmonologist at the Lankenau Medical Center, in Wynnewood, Pennsylvania.

== Biography ==
Horner was born on 15 September 1923 in Přerov, Czechoslovakia. In 1942, Horner, his parents and sister were sent to Theresienstadt Ghetto in Terezín, the "show" concentration camp northwest of Prague. Horner played piano and accordion for composer Gideon Klein and cabaret artist Karel Švenk. The family was sent to Auschwitz where the rest of his family were killed. Horner survived the death march after the camp was abandoned and returned to Prague to finish his studies. After emigrating to Australia to earn his medical degree, he then moved with his wife and sons to America in 1964.

On 22 October 2013, he performed Karel Švenk's cabaret tunes at Boston Symphony Hall with Yo-Yo Ma. Horner died on 23 April 2015, aged 91, in Newtown Square, Pennsylvania.
