= Jakob Herzog (writer) =

- Born: 17 June 1842; Mißlitz, Moravia, Austrian Empire
- Died: 10 April 1915 (aged 72); Vienna, Austria-Hungary
- Occupations: Writer, journalist, dramatist
- Writing career
- Language: German

Jakob Herzog (17 June 1842 – 10 April 1915) was an Austrian writer, journalist and dramatist.

== Biography ==
Jakob Herzog was born into a Jewish family in Mißlitz, Moravia (today Miroslav, Czech Republic), on 17 June 1842. He studied chemistry, economics, and literary history in Brno, Vienna, and Graz.

At the age of seventeen, Herzog began contributing to Ignaz Kuranda's Ostdeutsche Post. From 1870 until his death, he served as editor of the Vienna Montags-Revue, a publication he co-founded with Michael Klapp. Among his notable plays are Der Fischer von Helgoland, which premiered at the German theatre in Prague in 1888; Die Rose, first performed at the Burgtheater in Vienna in 1891, later appearing in Prague, Hamburg, Olmütz, and other venues; Kaufmann aus Tyrol, presented in 1893 and in Salzburg in 1894; and Prinz von Asturien, performed in 1893 in both Prague and Hamburg.

Herzog also served as the secretary of the Jewish community of Vienna for nearly two years.
