= Massimilla Doni (opera) =

Opera by Othmar Schoeck

Massimilla Doni is a 1935 German-language opera by Othmar Schoeck based on the story by Balzac.

== Recording ==
- Massimilla Doni Hermann Winkler (Duke Cattaneo); Harald Stamm (Capraja); Josef Protschka (Memmi); Roland Hermann (Prince Vendramin); Massimilla Doni (Edith Mathis). Kölner RSO and Choir/Gerd Albrecht CD1: 56:05 CD2: 71:17 127:22 Recorded January 1986 Koch Schwann CD314 025 K3
