= Terezín - Theresienstadt =

Terezín / Theresienstadt

Studio album by Anne Sofie von Otter
- Released: August 13, 2007
- Genre: Classical music
- Length: 1:11:30
- Label: Deutsche Grammophon
- Producer: Sid McLauchlan

Anne Sofie von Otter chronology
Noël (2006)	Terezín / Theresienstadt (2007)	Love Songs (2010)

Professional ratings
Review scores
Source	Rating
AllMusic	5/5 stars

Terezín – Theresienstadt is a 2007 recital album by mezzo-soprano Anne Sofie von Otter, her regular pianist Bengt Forsberg and guests. Von Otter is accompanied by baritone Christian Gerhaher in some of the songs and Daniel Hope concludes the disc with Erwin Schulhoff's sonata for solo violin.

== Overview ==
The album starts with Theresienstadt cabaret songs by Ilse Weber, Karel Švenk and Martin Roman (one of the very few who survived the camps), as well as classical composers Hans Krása, Viktor Ullmann, Pavel Haas, and Erwin Schulhoff.
