= Karel Švenk =

Czech entertainer

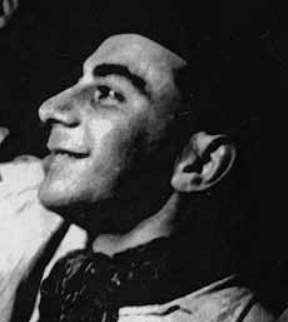
Karel Švenk

Karel Švenk, sometimes referred to in German as Karl Schwenk (17 March 1917 – 1 April 1945), was a Czech cabaret artist, comedian, songwriter and writer. A leading figure in the cabaret at the Theresienstadt Ghetto, Švenk was eventually sent to Auschwitz and later to Meuselwitz. He died on a death march from Kraslice about two weeks before the end of the war. Being completely exhausted and unable to continue, his friend hid him in the straw in the barn where the prisoners spent the night. It is unknown whether he died of exhaustion or was discovered by the SS and shot.

== Family background ==
Karel's parents were Rudolf Schwenk (1880–1944) and Klara Koráleková (1882–1944), both were killed in Auschwitz concentration camp presumably shortly after their arrived on 9 October 1944. Karel had three sisters – Erna, Lili, Ottilie as well as a younger brother Otta. Only Ottilie survived the Holocaust and emigrated to the US with her husband Rudolf Wenzel Köegler and son Heinrich Frederick Köegler.

== Biography ==
Švenk was born on 17 March 1917 in Prague. He was one of the members of the avant-garde Klub zapadlých talentů (German: Klub der ungenützten Talente, 'Club of Wasted Talents') in Prague. He was one of the first artists to be deported to Terezín on 24 November 1941, and was among the 342 young Jewish men sent to prepare the previously non-Jewish camp for the Jewish inmates to follow. In the autumn of 1942 he appeared in passing in the propaganda film Theresienstadt. Ein Dokumentarfilm aus dem jüdischen Siedlungsgebiet, standing with the puppeteer Otto Neumann and the dancer Kamila Rosenbaumová. Švenk was sent to Auschwitz, then to Meuselwitz. He died on a death march from Kraslice to Mauthausen, about 2 weeks before the end of the war. Totally exhausted and unable to continue he was hidden by his friend in the straw of the barn where he and the rest of the prisoners spent the night. It is not known whether he died of exhaustion or was discovered by the guards and shot.

== Theatre ==
While in Theresienstadt, Švenk wrote Der letzte Radfahrer ('The Last Cyclist'), a comic satire of the Nazis based on the premise that some inmates had escaped from the insane asylum and decided the cyclists were the cause of the world's troubles. The show was never performed, as it was banned by the Jewish Council of Elders, but it did reach a dress rehearsal. The script was partially preserved by Jana Šedová, who played one of the romantic leads in the original. Some set and costume designs of the show also survived. The play was reconstructed by playwright Naomi Patz, and in 2017 it played at La MaMa. A film of that production, directed by Edward Einhorn, was broadcast on WNET Channel 13, a PBS affiliate, as part of Theater Close Up, in 2022.

== Music compositions ==
- "Die verlorene Essensmarke" (The Lost Ration Ticket) with Rafael Schächter
- "Vsechno jde!" (Anything Goes!) "Theresienstädter Marsch" ("Terezín March") - a secret camp anthem, and his best-known composition.
- "Why Does the White Man Sit in the Front of the Bus?" - this was composed in Terezín and preserved by George Horner (musician) one of the Terezín cabaret musicians. It was later arranged by David Post and recorded by the Hawthorne String Quartet with Thomas Martin, clarinet.
- "Pod deštníkem" (Under an Umbrella) - recorded on Terezín - Theresienstadt (Anne Sofie von Otter album)
