= Venus (opera) =

Venus is a 1922 German-language opera by Othmar Schoeck, to a libretto by Armin Rueger after Prosper Mérimée's "La Vénus d'Ille" and Joseph Freiherr von Eichendorff's The Marble Statue. Its world premiere took place at Zurich Opera House on May 10, 1922.
