= Othmar Schoeck =

Swiss composer and conductor (1886–1957)

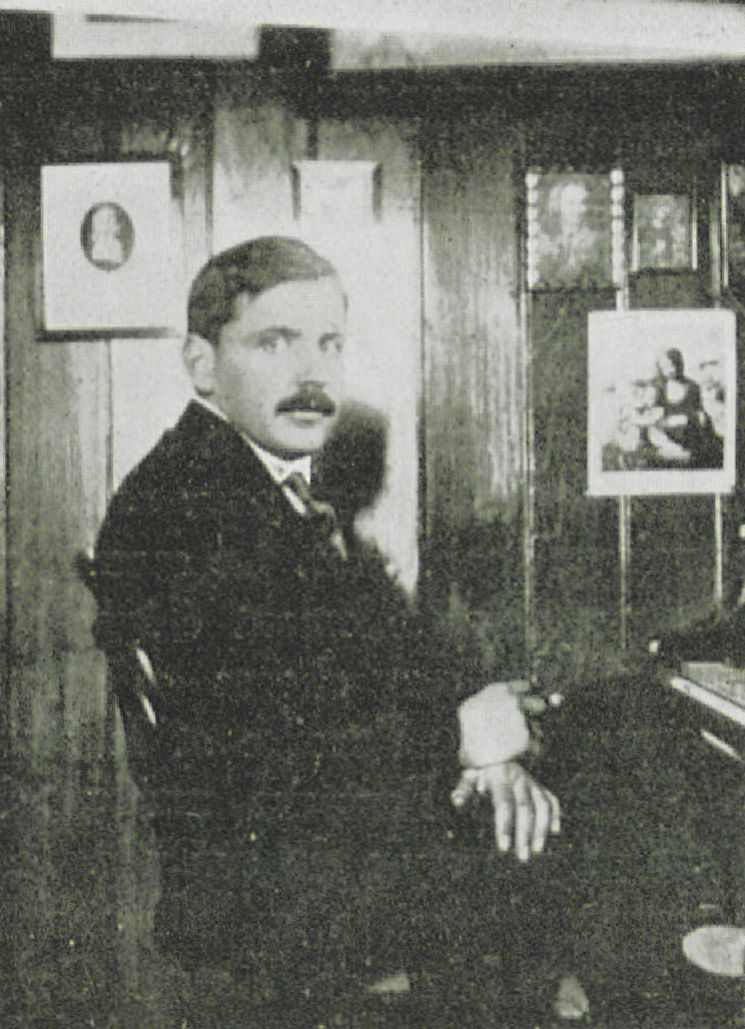
Othmar Schoeck (1917)

Othmar Schoeck (1 September 1886 – 8 March 1957) was a Swiss Romantic composer and conductor. He was known for his considerable output of art songs and song cycles but also wrote operas, notably the one-act Penthesilea, premiered in Dresden in 1927, and instrumental works, including two string quartets and concertos for violin (for Stefi Geyer), cello and horn.

== Biography ==
=== Early life and career ===
Schoeck was born in Brunnen, studied briefly at the Leipzig Conservatory with Max Reger in 1907/08, but otherwise spent his whole career in Zürich. His father, Alfred Schoeck was a landscape painter, and as a young man, Othmar seriously considered following in his father's footsteps and attended classes at an art school in Zürich before dropping out to go to the Zürich Conservatory.

During World War I Schoeck earned his living in Zurich initially as a chorus director and as a freelance accompanist and conductor. An annuity given him by the Winterthur industrialist Werner Reinhart from 1916 onwards, coupled with the income from his appointment as conductor of the St. Gall Symphony orchestra in 1917 (with special permission to remain resident in Zürich), allowed Schoeck to give up choral conducting and devote more time to composition instead.

=== Influence of Busoni ===
In 1916, Schoeck became acquainted with Ferruccio Busoni, who had moved to Zurich from Berlin to escape the adverse effects of the war. Busoni was not alone in coming to Zurich. The war had turned "provincial" Zurich, in neutral Switzerland, into an international metropolis. Schoeck was a great admirer of the songs of Hugo Wolf; Busoni disliked them, and he said so. Despite their differences, their relationship quickly developed into one of mutual respect, and even one with a bit of affection. In fact, it was Busoni's suggestion that Schoeck use Ludvig Holberg's Don Ranudo de Colibrados as the subject of an opera.

On 19 June 1917 Philipp Jarnach, a French composer who was also a refugee in Zurich, and an assistant of Busoni, gave Busoni a copy of Martin Buber's book Chinesische Geister- und Liebesgeschichten [Chinese Ghost and Love Stories] (Frankfurt, 1911). Jarnach suggested that one of these short stories might be suitable for an opera. Busoni immediately wrote a libretto, Das Wandbild [The Picture on the Wall], a short scene and pantomime, which he finished eight days later. Jarnach composed a prelude and the first scene, but lost interest and dropped the project. Undaunted, in June 1918 Busoni offered it to Schoeck. Schoeck, who appears to have taken the offer as a sort of challenge, immediately set aside the orchestration of Don Ranudo, and in three days, produced the new opera.

Das Wandbild is set in a Parisian antique shop around 1830. A student, Novalis, is captivated by a picture of a girl hanging on a wall of the shop. The picture comes to life, and in typical Busoni fashion, the scene immediately dissolves into a fantastical Chinese temple. The opera ends with Novalis awaking from his dream-state and escaping from the shop into the reality of the street. It is one of Schoeck's most unusual creations, "almost minimalist in conception."

=== Stylistic shift ===
Around 1918 Schoeck's music began a stylistic shift. At this time he became involved with the pianist Mary de Senger, who appears to have had a profound influence on his compositional style. The second act of his next opera, Venus (1919–1921), employs interesting polyrhythmic and bitonal effects. As he became acquainted with the work of Alban Berg and Les six in Paris, he began to feel isolated by his stylistic conservatism. By 1922 his former mentor, Busoni, who was now back in Berlin, wrote a letter to Volkmar Andreae, saying: "Schoeck has completely abandoned me. I have not entirely given him up. He lacks (or lacked) certain ingredients, which are not available at the chemists'. Which should however be manufactured in his own laboratory." After Venus, Schoeck completed the song cycle Elegie in 1922.

In the summer of 1923 Schoeck visited Arthur Honegger in Paris, and he later participated in the Salzburg ISCM festival. Not long afterwards, his affair with de Senger came to an end. His distress over the breakup, combined with the shock of the new music he had heard in Paris and Salzburg, seems to have led to a new maturity in his compositional style. Two weeks after his affair ended, he composed the song Die Entschwundene (1923), which was "as much a farewell to the tonal world of his previous music as to his departed lover."

When James Joyce visited Zurich in 1934, he was deeply impressed by Schoeck's work. In 1937, Schoeck's opera Massimilia Doni, after the short story by Balzac, premiered in Dresden.

Schoeck was not given to overt signs of gratitude, but he dedicated the song cycle Gaselen (1923), the Sonata for Bass Clarinet and Piano (1927–28), and the Suite in A flat for Strings (1945) to Werner Reinhart.

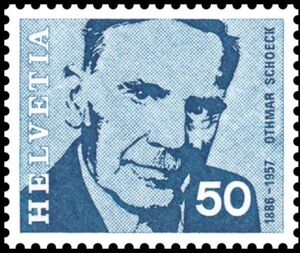
Swiss stamp, 1969

His work with the German poet Hermann Burte on the opera Das Schloss Dürande, for production at the Berlin State Opera, caused great controversy for Schoeck with the Swiss, because of his association with artists of Nazi Germany. The opera was premiered in Berlin on 1 April 1943 in the presence of Schoeck. Schoeck himself did not harbor Nazi sympathies, but the angry Swiss reaction to his actions damaged his reputation and put great strain on him. He suffered a heart attack in March 1944, but continued to compose.

=== Death and Legacy ===
Schoeck died in 1957. In 1969, the Swiss government honored Schoeck with a commemorative stamp. In the same year, SUISA, the Swiss musical authors' society, honored Schoeck with a commemorative fountain in the Zurich neighborhood of Wollishofen.

In 1986, Gerd Albrecht honored Schoeck with a concert for his 100th anniversary.

In 1999, one critic wrote that "his best works balance an expressive intensity and an opulence approaching the Straussian with a fine intellectual rigor and seriousness of purpose," and that his songs are "taut yet lyrical, Schubertian in their economy and penetrating textual insight."

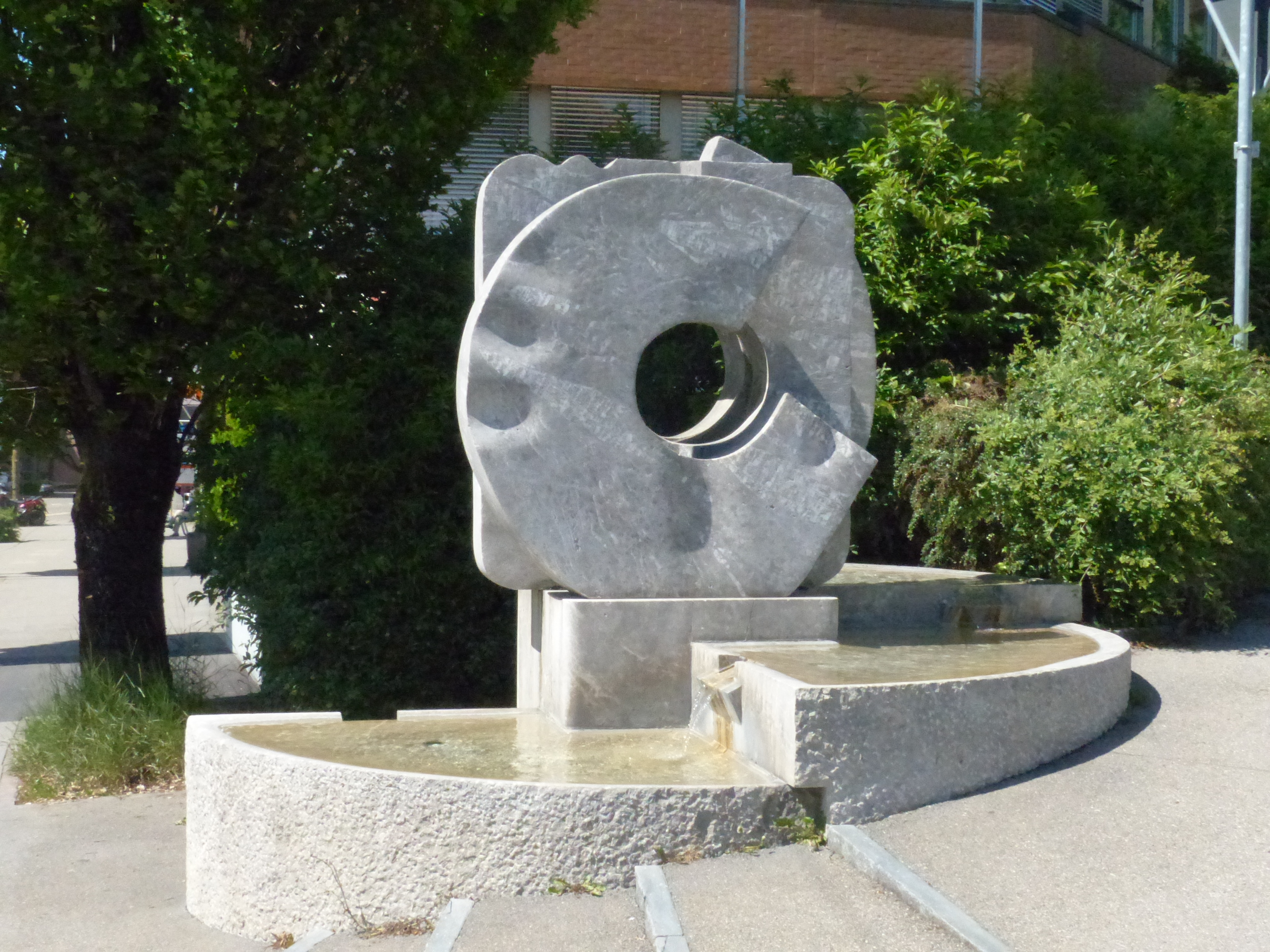
The Othmar Schoeck fountain in Wollishofen, Zurich, by Peter Meister (1969)

In 2018, his Summer Night, Pastoral Intermezzo for Strings, Op. 58, (1945), had its NY premiere at the Naumburg Orchestral Concerts, in the Naumburg Bandshell, Central Park, in the summer series.

== Popular culture references ==
- Wier Chrisemer, Teller and Penn Jillette were The Othmar Schoeck Memorial Society for the Preservation of Unusual and Disgusting Music, which later became the Asparagus Valley Cultural Society.

== Sources ==
- Beaumont, Antony, ed. (1987). Busoni: Selected Letters, New York: Columbia University Press. ISBN 0-231-06460-8.
- Sadie, S., & Tyrrell, J., eds. (2001). The New Grove Dictionary of Music and Musicians. New York: Grove's Dictionaries.
- Walton, Chris (2000). Essay in booklet accompanying the CD The Eye of the Storm: Ferruccio Busoni's Zurich friends & disciples, pp. 3–6. Ramsen, Switzerland: Guild Music Ltd. GMCD 7189.
- Jumeau-Lafond Jean-David, "Venus d'Othmar Schoeck ou le commandement de la statue", in "De l'archet au pinceau", (Dir. Philippe Junod), Payot / University of Lausanne, Lausanne, 1996.
- Chris Walton: Othmar Schoeck. Life and Works. University of Rochester Press, Rochester NY 2009; xvii, 444 p., ill. (Eastman Studies in Music); ISBN 978-1-58046-300-3; (with Concise work catalogue and discography p. 327-381).
