= Theresienstadt Ghetto and the Red Cross =

Nazi coverup of the Holocaust that fooled the Red Cross

During World War II, the Theresienstadt Ghetto was used by the Nazi SS (German: Schutzstaffel) as a "model ghetto" for deceiving International Committee of the Red Cross representatives about the ongoing Holocaust and the Nazi plan to murder all Jews. The German Red Cross visited the ghetto in 1943 and filed the only accurate report on the ghetto, describing overcrowding and undernourishment. In 1944, the ghetto was "beautified" in preparation for a delegation from the International Committee of the Red Cross (ICRC) and the Danish government. The delegation visited on 23 June; ICRC delegate Maurice Rossel wrote a favorable report on the ghetto and claimed that no one was deported from Theresienstadt. In April 1945, another ICRC delegation was allowed to visit the ghetto; despite the contemporaneous liberation of other concentration camps, it continued to repeat Rossel's erroneous findings. The SS turned over the ghetto to the ICRC on 2 May, several days before the end of the war.

== Background ==
=== Red Cross ===
During the Holocaust, the International Committee of the Red Cross (ICRC) was based in neutral Switzerland. Its policy was to maintain strict neutrality and avoid interfering with Nazi racial persecution, which was viewed as a German internal matter. As early as 1933, the ICRC had received pleas to intervene in favor of concentration camp prisoners, but it was hesitant to accept German invitations to visit concentration camps. Carl Jacob Burckhardt, an ICRC official who made most of the key decisions regarding Nazi Germany, stated in a September 1935 meeting that it was "dangerous to occupy oneself" with the concentration camps; he was certain that such visits would be exploited by the Nazis for propaganda purposes. Burckhardt did eventually visit Dachau concentration camp; his main complaint was that political prisoners and criminals were not kept separate. The ICRC considered its primary focus to be prisoners of war whose countries had signed the 1929 Geneva Convention, which did not cover civilians. However, as Huber emphasized in a press conference with German reporters in 1940, the ICRC's bylaws did not restrict the organization's mission to detainees covered by the Geneva Conventions. The ICRC took small scale action to help civilians from the beginning of the war in 1939, although the ICRC's leverage against the German government was limited by these detainees' lack of protection under international law.

After Adolf Hitler seized power in 1933, the German Red Cross (DRK) elected to conform to the Nazi regime (German: Gleichschaltung) rather than disband. Schutzstaffel (SS) general Ernst-Robert Grawitz became the head of the DRK in 1937; American historian Gerald Steinacher describes him as a "fanatical Nazi" and "close follower of SS leader Heinrich Himmler". Grawitz was closely involved in Aktion T4 (the murder of disabled people) and Nazi human experimentation. According to Steinacher, the appointment of Grawitz signified that the DRK "had for all practical purposes [...] turned into a National Socialist medical service unit" supporting the German war effort. Questioned by ICRC officials in the early 1930s, the DRK claimed that it had free access to concentration camps, where the inmates were treated well and enjoyed better conditions than the general civilian population. The ICRC had access to independent information describing murders in the camps. On several occasions, the DRK hindered the efforts by the ICRC to help the victims of Nazi persecution. Although Walther Georg Hartmann, the delegate to the ICRC, has often been praised as one of the only humanitarians in the Nazified DRK, (Note: For example, Jean-Claude Favez describes him as "a devoted, albeit wary, upholder of the Red Cross ethos" and one of the best sources of information for the ICRC of events in German-occupied areas.) he had been a member of the Nazi Party since 1933.

=== Theresienstadt ===
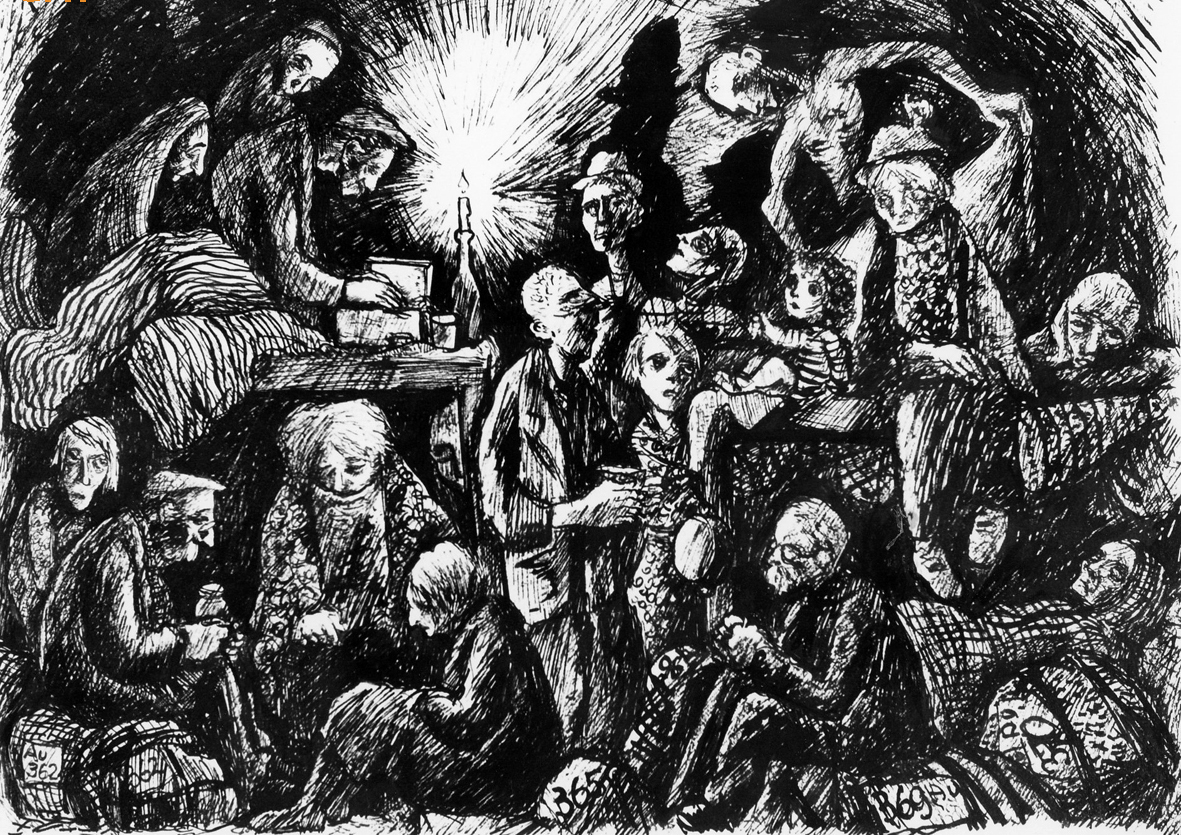
Bedřich Fritta's caricature of Theresienstadt living conditions

Theresienstadt was a hybrid concentration camp and ghetto established by the SS in November 1941 in the fortress town Terezín, located in the Protectorate of Bohemia and Moravia (German-occupied Czech lands). It was simultaneously a waystation to the extermination camps, and a "retirement settlement" for elderly and prominent Jews to mislead their communities about the Final Solution. The harsh conditions were deliberately engineered to cause the death of prisoners. Of the approximately 155,000 people sent to Theresienstadt before the end of the war, 35,000 died at the ghetto from hunger and disease and 83,000 perished after deportation to various ghettos, extermination camps, and other killing sites. The ghetto was run by the Council of Elders headed by the "Jewish elder", which was responsible for implementing Nazi orders.

== Red Cross involvement with Theresienstadt ==
=== ICRC attempts to send supplies ===
In 1942, the ICRC confirmed the existence of a Jewish ghetto at Theresienstadt and discovered that it was possible to send medicines, emboldening them to try that strategy with other concentration camps. Soon after, Roland Marti, the ICRC delegate in Berlin, requested permission for a trial visit to Theresienstadt, expecting that it would be easier to get permission than for other camps, but his request was denied. The DRK claimed that there was sufficient food and supplies at Theresienstadt, and Red Cross parcels were therefore unnecessary. In May 1943, the ICRC received confirmation signed by the Jewish elder at Theresienstadt that some food parcels had reached it. The ICRC's efforts to send food parcels to concentration camps were hampered by the American Red Cross's refusal to lobby the Allies to allow an exemption in the blockade of Nazi Germany for food imports destined for concentration camps. In order to avoid the parcels being siphoned off by the SS, the ICRC was only allowed to send them to named recipients.

=== DRK visit (June 1943) ===
Burckhardt pressured the DRK into visiting Theresienstadt in order to elucidate whether the ghetto was a final destination for Jewish prisoners or a transit point to locations further east. He also wanted to confirm the delivery of food parcels. Adolf Eichmann (and possibly his superiors in the Reich Security Main Office [RSHA]) were eager to allow the visit, as part of a strategy of concealing the Final Solution. On 24, 27, or 28 June 1943, DRK representative Walther Georg Hartmann and his deputy, Heinrich Nieuhaus, were allowed to visit the ghetto, guided by German Foreign Ministry official Eberhard von Thadden. They confirmed the delivery of Red Cross supplies and secured permission from the SS that overflows would be sent to other camps, especially Auschwitz concentration camp. In his report, Hartmann described the ghetto's conditions as "dreadful" and "frightfully overcrowded"; the prisoners were severely undernourished and medical care was completely inadequate. Of all Red Cross reports on Theresienstadt, Hartmann's was the only one to be broadly accurate. Hartmann leaked his impressions to ICRC official André de Pilar, who in turn reported them to the ICRC in Geneva and to Gerhart Riegner, secretary of the World Jewish Congress in Geneva, directly in July 1943. Contrary to SS expectations, the visit actually increased DRK suspicions about the Nazi extermination program.

=== Request for ICRC visit (November 1943) ===
The Danish government, Danish Red Cross, Danish king Christian X, and Danish clergy also pressured the DRK to allow a visit, because of the 450 Danish Jews who had been deported there in October 1943. The Danish Red Cross began to send food parcels, at a rate of 700 per month, to Danish prisoners even before they were given permission to do so. On a visit to Denmark in November 1943, Eichmann promised Danish representatives that they would be allowed to visit in the spring of 1944. The ICRC had come under increasing pressure from Jewish organizations and the Czechoslovak government-in-exile to intervene in favor of Jews, although Israeli historian Livia Rothkirchen considers the pressure on the ICRC from Danish institutions to be decisive in prodding the ICRC to renew its request to visit Theresienstadt also in November. The RSHA saw the visit as an opportunity to cast doubt on reports of extermination reaching Western countries, but wanted to prepare the ghetto sufficiently so that the ICRC delegation would get a good impression.

=== "Beautification" (February 1944–June 1944) ===
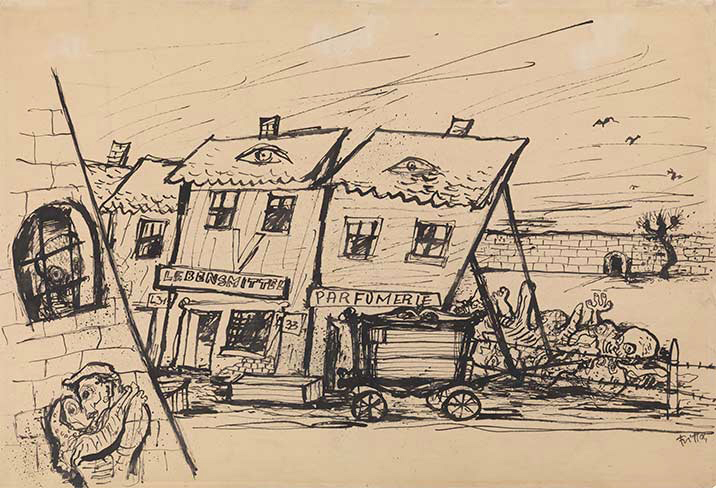
Fritta mocks the "beautification" campaign.

In February 1944, the SS embarked on a "beautification" (German: Verschönerung) campaign in order to prepare the ghetto for the Red Cross visit. Many "Prominent" prisoners and Danish Jews were re-housed in private, superior quarters. The streets were renamed and cleaned; sham shops and a school were set up; the SS encouraged the prisoners to perform an increasing number of cultural activities, which exceeded that of an ordinary town in peacetime. As part of the preparations, 7,503 people were sent to the Theresienstadt family camp at Auschwitz in May 1944; the transports targeted sick, elderly, and disabled people who had no place in the ideal Jewish settlement. In late May, Paul Eppstein, Otto Zucker, and other Theresienstadt leaders were allowed to sign SS-dictated letters, which were sent to the Aid and Rescue Committee, a Jewish organization in Budapest. Rudolf Kastner, the leader of the committee, forwarded the letter abroad.

It is unclear to what extent the ICRC valued making an accurate report on Theresienstadt, given that it had access to independent information confirming that prisoners were transported to Auschwitz and murdered there. (Note: Information about Jews deported to Auschwitz from Theresienstadt was published in the Jewish Chronicle in February 1944. News of the first liquidation of the Theresienstadt family camp was relayed by the Polish underground state to the Polish government-in-exile and the ICRC. The report was published in the official newspaper of the government-in-exile in early June, before Rossel's visit. The information was also confirmed by the Vrba–Wetzler report, received in Switzerland around the same time as Rossel's visit.) Leo Janowitz, a member of the Theresienstadt self-administration, had been on the first transport to the family camp in September 1943. The next month, the Auschwitz camp administration allowed him to send a letter to Fritz Ullmann, a Jewish Agency representative in Geneva, with a list of prisoners deported from Theresienstadt. On 16 June 1944, the BBC European Service reported:

These Jews [scheduled to be murdered in June] were transported to Birkenau from the concentration camp of Theresienstadt on the Elbe, last December. Four thousand Czech Jews who were taken from Theresienstadt to Birkenau in September 1943 were massacred in the gas chambers on March 7th.

=== 23 June 1944 visit ===
Photo taken by Maurice Rossel at Theresienstadt. Most of the children were murdered at Auschwitz in the fall of 1944. (Note: According to one of the surviving children in this photo, Paul Rabinowitsch (1930–2009) from Denmark, third from left, the date the photo was taken was the only day he was allowed to eat his fill while imprisoned at Theresienstadt.)

The commission that visited on June 23, 1944, included Maurice Rossel, a representative of the ICRC; E. Juel-Henningsen, the head physician at the Danish Ministry of Health; and Franz Hvass, the top civil servant at the Danish Foreign Ministry. Swiss historians Sébastien Farré and Yan Schubert view the choice of the young and inexperienced Rossel as indicative of the ICRC's indifference to Jewish suffering. However, Swiss historian Jean-Claude Favez argues that the SS were eager to show Theresienstadt to Burckhardt or another high-ranking ICRC representative, while the ICRC worried that such attention would legitimize Nazi propaganda.

On 23 June 1944, the visitors were led on a tour through the "Potemkin village". The visitors spent eight hours inside Theresienstadt, led on a predetermined path and only allowed to speak with Danish Jews and selected representatives, including Paul Eppstein. Driven in a limousine by an SS officer posing as his driver, Eppstein was forced to deliver an SS-written speech describing Theresienstadt as "a normal country town" of which he was "mayor", and give the visitors fabricated statistical data on the ghetto. He still had a black eye from a beating administered by commandant Karl Rahm, and attempted to warn Rossel that there was "no way out" for Theresienstadt prisoners. A soccer game and performance of the children's opera Brundibár were also staged for the guests.

=== Aftermath ===
Rossel's report stated that conditions in the ghetto were favorable—even superior than for civilians in the Protectorate of Bohemia and Moravia—and that no one was deported from Theresienstadt. Questioned by ICRC official Johannes von Schwarzenberg, he was not able to explain the discrepancy in the ICRC's population figures concerning the ghetto: 30,000 people who were said to have been sent to Auschwitz. The Danish representatives reported that whether Theresienstadt was a transit camp was an "open question", and expressed sympathy for the prisoners. Although all of the visitors had promised to keep their reports secret, some information from Rossel's report was leaked to the World Jewish Congress, prompting them to protest the inaccuracy of the report and request another ICRC visit to the ghetto.

For the remaining prisoners conditions improved somewhat: according to one survivor, "The summer of 1944 was the best time we had in Terezín. Nobody thought of new transports." Rabbi Leo Baeck, a spiritual leader at Theresienstadt, stated that "The effect [of the Red Cross visit] on our morale was devastating. We felt forgotten and forsaken."

Following the publicization of the Auschwitz Protocols in the summer of 1944 describing mass murder at Auschwitz, Jewish organizations pressured the ICRC to visit Theresienstadt again. In the meantime, 18,400 people were deported to Auschwitz in September and October 1944.

=== Negotiated release (February and April 1945) ===
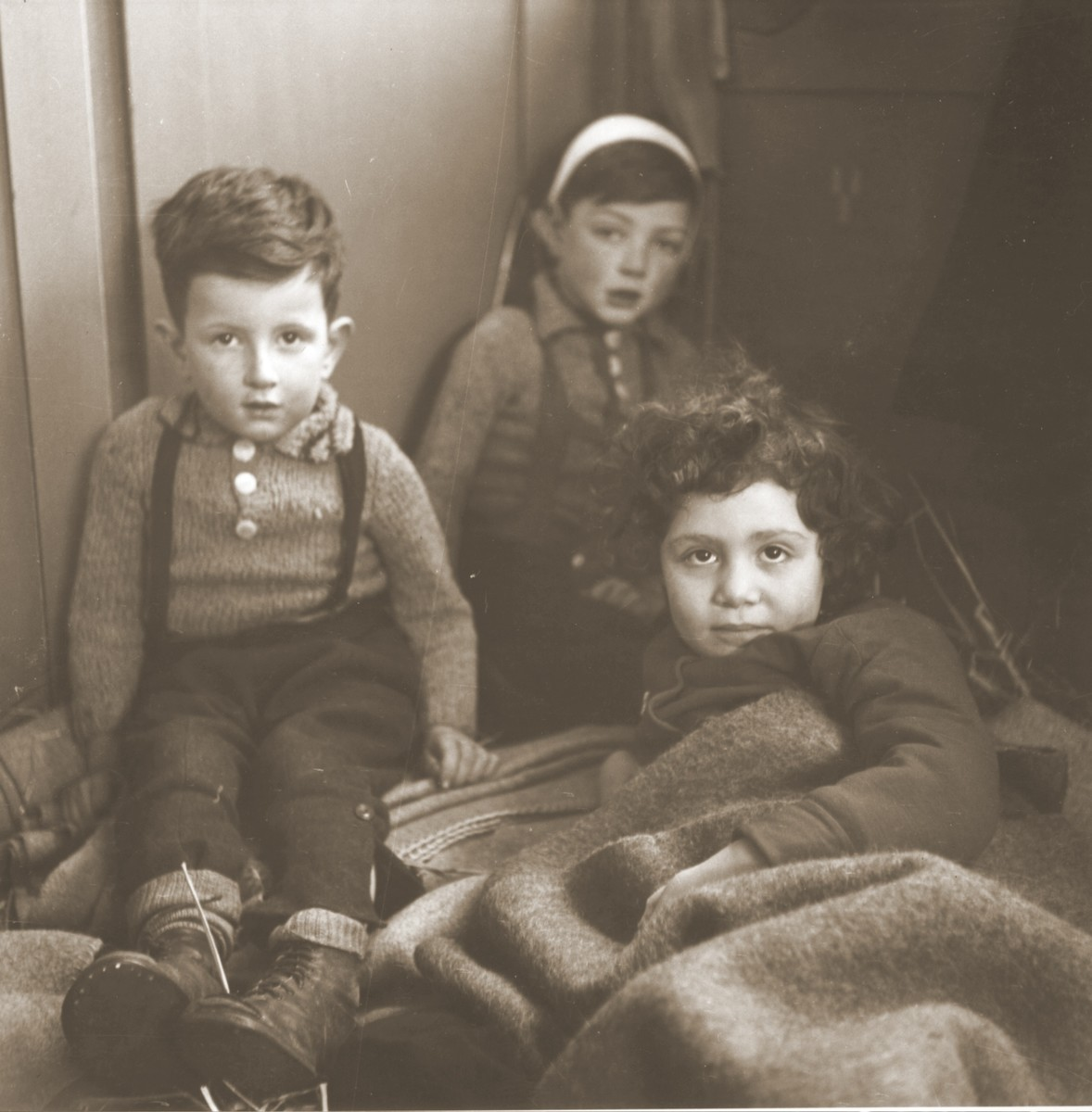
Jewish children recuperate in St. Gallen, Switzerland, 11 February 1945.

On 5 February 1945, after negotiations with Swiss politician Jean-Marie Musy, Himmler released a transport of 1,200 Jews (mostly from Germany and Holland) from Theresienstadt to neutral Switzerland. This event received international media coverage, and the released prisoners stated that the previous ICRC visit had been staged. The Danish king secured the release of the Danish internees from Theresienstadt on 15 April 1945. The White Buses, organised by the Danish government in cooperation with the Swedish Red Cross, repatriated the 423 surviving Danish Jews.

=== April 1945 missions ===
Simultaneously with the first liberations of concentration camps by Western Allied forces, ICRC delegates Otto Lehner and Paul Dunant arrived at Theresienstadt, accompanied by Swiss diplomat Buchmüller, on 6 April 1945 and toured the ghetto, escorted by Eichmann. Dunant was allowed to speak to Benjamin Murmelstein, who had become Jewish elder after Eppstein was shot by the SS at the nearby Theresienstadt Small Fortress in September 1944. Lehner viewed the Nazi propaganda film Theresienstadt, which had been filmed at the ghetto before the deportations in fall 1944. Rothkirchen suggests that the main goal of this expedition was to confirm Rossel's findings; she cites a passage in Lehner's report:

The overall impression made by the camp was very favorable; we also refer to the report of Dr. Rossel and we may add that nothing has changed in the meantime... The elder of the Jews is currently Herr Murmelstein. The former elder of the Jews, Dr. Eppstein, was transferred to the East six months ago. According to the testimony of the elder of the Jews as well as of the German authorities, no deportations have taken place recently: 10,000 Jews were dispatched to the camps in the East, especially in Auschwitz... [the deported Jews] are engaged in enlarging the camp in Auschwitz, (Note: Rothkirchen points out that most Jews were murdered upon their arrival at Auschwitz, and the camp had already been liberated.) others are employed in administration. (Note: Dunant was more cautious in his report, stating that More interesting than the actual living conditions and installations in the ghetto of Theresienstadt was the question whether it had indeed served merely as a transit camp for the Jews and how many deportations to the East had taken place.)

Later in his report, Lehner repeats Nazi propaganda describing Theresienstadt as a "Zionist experiment". (Note: "The idea of the Reich government in establishing Theresienstadt was to create a Jewish community to be run by its self-government, which would serve as a practical experiment on a small scale, for the future Jewish state to which a certain strip of land should be allotted after the war. The miniature Jewish state in Theresienstadt rests on the principle of collective economy. There exists a kind of elite communism, which is strongly reflected in the overall structure.") Following the visit, Lehner and Dunant dined at Czernin Palace in Prague with Eichmann; Karl Hermann Frank, Higher SS and Police Leader for the Protectorate; and Erwin Weinmann, head of the SD in Prague. Eichmann denied that Jews were being killed. Dunant visited Theresienstadt again on 21 April, at which point he issued a report confirming Rossel's and Lehner's findings and claiming that the visits had not been staged. 15,500 prisoners, survivors of the death marches, arrived at Theresienstadt in the final days of the war, starting a typhoid epidemic. After the SS relinquished control of the ghetto on 2 May, Dunant took over the administration and provided aid from a headquarters in Prague. Czechoslovak Red Cross personnel arrived on 4 May, but they focused their efforts on political prisoners at the Small Fortress and, when they did help prisoners in the Jewish ghetto, were dismissive of foreign (non-Czechoslovak) Jews.

== Impact and assessment ==
According to Czech historian Miroslav Kárný, Rossel's report, particularly his insistence that Jews were not deported from Theresienstadt, had the effect of diminishing the credibility of the Vrba–Wetzler report. Written by two Auschwitz escapees, Rudolf Vrba and Alfred Wetzler, the latter report accurately described the fate of Jews deported from Theresienstadt to Auschwitz—most were murdered.

Rossel's statement that Jews were not deported from Theresienstadt caused the ICRC to cancel a planned visit to the Theresienstadt family camp, to which Heinrich Himmler had already given his permission. Kárný and Israeli historian Otto Dov Kulka draw a direct connection between the report and the liquidation of the family camp in July, in which 6,500 people were murdered. Rossel sent his photographs to von Thadden, who showed copies of the photographs in a press conference in an attempt to disprove reports on the Holocaust.

Rossel's report has been described as "emblematic of the failure of the ICRC" to advocate for Jews during the Holocaust. According to Steinacher, the report "certainly discredited the organization" for its naïveté or "complicit[y] in a cruel fiction", especially because Rossel continued to defend his conclusions after the war. More generally, Rothkirchen writes that the fate suffered by the prisoners of the ghetto "can be considered the touchstone of the negative role of the ICRC during World War II". However, the case of Theresienstadt was not unique; a similar visit to Drancy by Jacques de Morsier in May 1944 produced a "glowing" report.
