= 2018 New York Film Festival =

56th edition

- Opening film: The Favourite
- Closing film: At Eternity's Gate
- Location: New York City, United States
- Founded: 1963
- Founded by: Richard Roud and Amos Vogel
- Hosted by: Film at Lincoln Center
- Artistic director: Kent Jones
- Festival date: September 28 – October 14, 2018
- Website: https://www.filmlinc.org/nyff/

New York Film Festival
- 2019 2017

The 56th New York Film Festival took place from September 28 to October 14, 2018, in New York City, presented by Film at Lincoln Center.

Yorgos Lanthimos' The Favourite was the opening film. Alfonso Cuarón's Roma was the festival centerpiece. Julian Schnabel's At Eternity's Gate was the closing film.

Appearing in the NYFF's "Main Slate" for the first time were: Louis Garrel, Ying Liang, Mariano Llinás, Alex Ross Perry, Bi Gan, Richard Billingham, Dominga Sotomayor Castillo and Paul Dano.

World premieres included: John Hoffman and Nanfu Wang's Out of Many, One, and Tom Surgal's Fire Music.

== Official Selections ==
=== Main Slate ===
The following film were selected for the Main Slate section:

English Title	Original Title	Director(s)	Production Country
3 Faces	سه رخ	Jafar Panahi	Iran
Asako I & II	寝ても覚めても	Ryusuke Hamaguchi	Japan
Ash Is Purest White	江湖儿女	Jia Zhangke	China
At Eternity's Gate (closing film)		Julian Schnabel	France, United Kingdom, United States
The Ballad of Buster Scruggs		Joel and Ethan Coen	United States
Burning	버닝	Lee Chang-dong	South Korea, Japan
Cold War	Zimna wojna	Paweł Pawlikowski	Poland, France, United Kingdom
A Faithful Man	L'Homme fidèle	Louis Garrel	France
A Family Tour	自由行	Ying Liang	Taiwan, Hong Kong, Singapore, Malaysia
The Favourite (opening film)		Yorgos Lanthimos	Ireland, United Kingdom, United States
La flor		Mariano Llinás	Argentina
Grass	풀잎들	Hong Sang-soo	South Korea
Happy as Lazzaro	Lazzaro Felice	Alice Rohrwacher	Italy, Switzerland, France, Germany
Her Smell		Alex Ross Perry	United States
High Life		Claire Denis	France, Germany, United States, United Kingdom, Poland
Hotel by the River	강변 호텔	Hong Sang-soo	South Korea
If Beale Street Could Talk		Barry Jenkins	United States
The Image Book	Le livre d'images	Jean-Luc Godard	Switzerland, France
In My Room		Ulrich Köhler	Germany
Long Day's Journey into Night	地球最後的夜晚	Bi Gan	China, France
Monrovia, Indiana		Frederick Wiseman	United States
Non-Ficition	Doubles vies	Olivier Assayas	France
Private Life		Tamara Jenkins	United States
Ray & Liz		Richard Billingham	United Kingdom
Roma (centerpiece)		Alfonso Cuarón	Mexico, United States
Shoplifters	万引き家族	Hirokazu Kore-eda	Japan
Sorry Angel	Plaire, aimer et courir vite	Christophe Honoré	France
Too Late to Die Young	Tarde para morir joven	Dominga Sotomayor	Chile
Transit		Christian Petzold	Germany
Wildlife		Paul Dano	United States

=== Special Events ===
The following film were selected to be screened:

English Title	Original Title	Director(s)	Production Country
Border	Gräns	Ali Abbasi	Sweden
Mid90s		Jonah Hill	United States
Out of Many, One (short)		John Hoffman and Nanfu Wang	United States
The Four Horsemen of the Apocalypse (1921)		Rex Ingram	United States
The Other Side of the Wind		Orson Welles	United States, France
The Wild Pear Tree	Ahlat Ağacı	Nuri Bilge Ceylan	Turkey, France, Germany, Bulgaria, North Macedonia, Bosnia and Herzegovina, Sweden
They'll Love Me When I'm Dead		Morgan Neville	United States

=== Spotlight on Documentary ===
The following film were selected to the Spotlight on Documentary section:

English Title	Original Title	Director(s)	Production Country
American Dharma		Errol Morris	United States, United Kingdom
Angels Are Made of Light		James Longley	United States
Carmine Street Guitars		Ron Mann	Canada
The Cold Blue		Erik Nelson	United States
Divide and Conquer: The Story of Roger Ailes		Alexis Bloom	United States
Dream of a City (short)		Manfred Kirchheimer	United States
End of Life		John Bruce and Paweł Wojtasik	United States
Fire Music		Tom Surgal	United States
Maria by Callas		Tom Volf	France
The Memphis Belle: A Story of a Flying Fortress (1944)		William Wyler	United States
The Times of Bill Cunningham		Mark Bozek	United States
The Waldheim Waltz	Waldheims Walzer	Ruth Beckermann	Austria
Watergate	Watergate or: How We Learned to Stop an Out of Control President	Charles Ferguson	United States
What You Gonna Do When the World's on Fire?		Roberto Minervini	Italy, France, United States

=== Projections ===
The following film were selected to the Projections section:

English Title	Original Title	Director(s)	Production Country
11 x 14 (1977)		James Benning	United States
Cinderella (short) (1986)		Ericka Beckman	United States
Classical Period		Ted Fendt	United States
Diamantino		Gabriel Abrantes and Daniel Schmidt	Portugal, France, Brazil
From Its Mouth Came a River of High-End Residential Appliances (short)		Jon Wang	United States
The Grand Bizarre		Jodie Mack	United States
Gropius Memory Palace (short)		Ben Thorp Brown	Germany, United States
Roi Soleil		Albert Serra	Spain, Portugal
Second Time Around	Segunda Vez	Dora García	Belgium, Norway

=== Revivals ===
The following film were selected to the Revivals section:

English Title	Original Title	Director(s)	Production Country
Detour (1945)		Edgar G. Ulmer	United States
Hyenas (1992)	Hyènes	Djibril Diop Mambéty	Senegal
I Am Cuba (1964)	Soy Cuba / Я — Куба	Mikhail Kalatozov	Cuba, Soviet Union
In Love (1946)	Enamorada	Emilio Fernández	Mexico
Khrustalyov, My Car! (1998)	Хрусталёв, машину!	Aleksei Yuryevich German	Russia, France
Neapolitan Carousel (1954)	Carosello napoletano	Ettore Giannini	Italy
None Shall Escape (1944)		Andre de Toth	United States
Spring Night, Summer Night (1967)		Joseph L. Anderson	United States
The Red House (1947)		Delmer Daves	United States
The War at Home (1979)		Glenn Silber and Barry Alexander Brown	United States
Tunes of Glory (1960)		Ronald Neame	United Kingdom

=== Retrospective ===
Alongside a tribute to the late film industry luminaries Dan Talbot and Pierre Rissient, the following films were selected for the Retrospective section:

English Title	Original Title	Director(s)	Production Country
The American Friend (1977)	Der amerikanische Freund	Wim Wenders	West Germany, France
Before the Revolution (1964)	Prima della rivoluzione	Bernardo Bertolucci	Italy
Be Natural: The Untold Story of Alice Guy-Blaché		Pamela B. Green	United States
The Ceremony (1971)	儀式	Nagisa Ōshima	Japan
Every Man for Himself (1980)	Sauve qui peut (la vie)	Jean-Luc Godard	France, Austria, West Germany, Switzerland
House by the River (1950)		Fritz Lang	United States
Introduzione All’Oscuro		Gastón Solnicki	Austria, Argentina
Manila in the Claws of Light (1975)	Maynila, sa mga Kuko ng Liwanag	Lino Brocka	Philippines
The Man I Love (1947)		Raoul Walsh	United States
The Marriage of Maria Braun (1979)	Die Ehe der Maria Braun	Rainer Werner Fassbinder	West Germany
Mother India (1957)	मदर इण्डिया	Mehboob Khan	India
My Dinner with Andre (1981)		Louis Malle	United States
Play Misty for Me (1971)		Clint Eastwood	United States
Searching For Ingmar Bergman	Auf der suche nach Ingmar Bergman	Margarethe von Trotta, Felix Moeller and Bettina Böhler	Germany, France
A Touch of Zen (1970)	俠女	King Hu	Taiwan, Hong Kong
Time Without Pity (1957)		Joseph Losey	United Kingdom
