= 2017 New York Film Festival =

55th edition

- Opening film: Last Flag Flying
- Closing film: Wonder Wheel
- Location: New York City, United States
- Founded: 1963
- Founded by: Richard Roud and Amos Vogel
- Hosted by: Film at Lincoln Center
- Artistic director: Kent Jones
- Festival date: September 28 – October 15, 2017
- Website: https://www.filmlinc.org/nyff/

New York Film Festival
- 2018 2016

The 55th New York Film Festival took place from September 28 to October 15, 2017, in New York City, presented by Film at Lincoln Center.

The festival's opening film was Richard Linklater's Last Flag Flying. Todd Haynes' Wonderstruck was the festival's centerpiece. Woody Allen's Wonder Wheel was the closing film.

Appearing in the NYFF's "Main Slate" for the first time were: Robin Campillo, Luca Guadagnino, JR, Alain Gomis, Sean Baker, Greta Gerwig, Serge Bozon, Dee Rees, Chloé Zhao, and Valeska Grisebach.

World premieres included: Claude Lanzmann's Shoah: Four Sisters, Richard Linklater's Last Flag Flying, Rory Kennedy's Without a Net: The Digital Divide in America, Susan Lacy's Spielberg, and Woody Allen's Wonder Wheel

== Official Selections ==
=== Main slate ===
The following film were selected for the Main Slate section:

English Title	Original Title	Director(s)	Production Country
Before We Vanish	散歩する侵略者	Kiyoshi Kurosawa	Japan
BPM (Beats per Minute)	120 battements par minute	Robin Campillo	France
Call Me by Your Name		Luca Guadagnino	Italy, United States, France, Brazil
The Day After	그 후	Hong Sang-soo	South Korea
Faces Places	Visages Villages	Agnès Varda and JR	France
Félicité		Alain Gomis	Senegal, France
The Florida Project		Sean Baker	United States
Ismael's Ghosts	Les Fantômes d'Ismaël	Arnaud Desplechin	France
Lady Bird		Greta Gerwig	United States
Last Flag Flying (opening film)		Richard Linklater	United States
Let the Sunshine In	Un beau soleil intérieur	Claire Denis	France
Lover for a Day	L'Amant d'un jour	Philippe Garrel	France
The Meyerowitz Stories		Noah Baumbach	United States
Mrs. Hyde	Madame Hyde	Serge Bozon	France
Mudbound		Dee Rees	United States
On the Beach at Night Alone	밤의 해변에서 혼자	Hong Sang-soo	South Korea
The Other Side of Hope	Toivon tuolla puolen	Aki Kaurismäki	Finland, Germany
The Rider		Chloé Zhao	United States
Spoor	Pokot	Agnieszka Holland	Poland, Czech Republic, Germany
The Square		Ruben Östlund	Sweden, France, Germany, Denmark
Thelma		Joachim Trier	Norway, Sweden, Denmark, France
Western		Valeska Grisebach	Germany, Austria, Bulgaria
Wonderstruck (centerpiece)		Todd Haynes	United States
Wonder Wheel (closing film)		Woody Allen	United States
Zama		Lucrecia Martel	Argentina, Spain

=== Special Events ===
The following film were selected to be screened:

English Title	Original Title	Director(s)	Production Country
A Gentle Creature	Кро́ткая	Sergei Loznitsa	France, Ukraine, Germany, Latvia, Lithuania, Netherlands, Russia
First Reformed		Paul Schrader	United States
Mindhunter (episodes 1 and 2)		David Fincher	United States
The Opera House		Susan Froemke	United States
Pandora's Box (1929)	Die Büchse der Pandora	G. W. Pabst	Germany
Shoah: Four Sisters	Les quatre soeurs	Claude Lanzmann	France
Spielberg		Susan Lacy	United States
Trouble No More		Jennifer Lebeau	United States
Without a Net: The Digital Divide in America		Rory Kennedy	United States

=== Spotlight on Documentaries ===
The following film were selected to the Spotlight on Documentary section:

English title	Original title	Director(s)	Production Country
Arthur Miller: Writer		Rebecca Miller	United States
Boom for Real: The Late Teenage Years of Jean-Michel Basquiat		Sara Driver	United States
Cielo		Alison McAlpine	Chile, Canada
Did You Wonder Who Fired the Gun?		Travis Wilkerson	United States
El mar la mar		Joshua Bonnetta and J. P. Sniadecki	United States
Filmworker		Tony Zierra	United States
Hall of Mirrors		Ena Talakic and Ines Talakic	United States
Jane		Brett Morgen	United States
Joan Didion: The Center Will Not Hold		Griffin Dunne	United States
No Stone Unturned		Alex Gibney	United Kingdom
Piazza Vittorio		Abel Ferrara	Italy, United States
The Rape of Recy Taylor		Nancy Buirski	United States
Sea Sorrow		Vanessa Redgrave	United Kingdom
A Skin So Soft	Ta peau si lisse	Denis Côté	Canada, France, Switzerland
Speak Up	À voix haute	Stéphane de Freitas	France
The Venerable W.	Le vénérable W.	Barbet Schroeder	France, Switzerland
Voyeur		Myles Kane and Josh Koury	United States
Three Music Films by Mathieu Amalric: C’est presque au bout du monde, Zorn, Music Is Music		Mathieu Amalric	France

=== Projections ===
In addition to the following feature films, the Projections lineup also included several programs of short films, including programs devoted to the work of Barbara Hammer and Mike Henderson.

English title	Original title	Director(s)	Production Country
Caniba		Véréna Paravel and Lucien Castaing-Taylor	France, United States
Dragonfly Eyes	Qing ting zhi yan	Xu Bing	China
Electro-Pythagoras and Vivian’s Garden		Luke Fowler	United Kingdom
Le Fort des fous		Narimane Mari	France, Algeria, Greece, Germany, Qatar
Good Luck		Ben Russell	France, Germany
Occidental		Neïl Beloufa	France
Tonsler Park		Kevin Jerome Everson	United States
The Worldly Cave		Zhou Tao	China

=== Revivals ===
The following film were selected to be screened:

English title	Original title	Director(s)	Production Country
L'Atalante (1934)		Jean Vigo	France
Bob the Gambler (1956)	Bob le flambeur	Jean-Pierre Melville	France
The Crime of Monsieur Lange (1936)	Le Crime de Monsieur Lange	Jean Renoir	France
The Crucified Lovers (1954)	近松物語	Kenji Mizoguchi	Japan
Down to Earth (1995)	Casa de Lava	Pedro Costa	Portugal
Daughter of the Nile (1987)	尼羅河女兒	Hou Hsiao-hsien	Taiwan
L'Enfant Secret (1979)		Philippe Garrel	France
Grandeur and Decadence (a/k/a The Rise and Fall of a Small Film Company) (1986)	Grandeur et décadence d'un petit commerce de cinéma	Jean-Luc Godard	France
Hallelujah the Hills (1963)		Adolfas Mekas	United States
Lucía (1968)		Humberto Solás	Cuba
The Old Dark House (1932)		James Whale	United States
One Sings, the Other Doesn't (1977)	L'une chante, l'autre pas	Agnès Varda	France
Le Révélateur (1968)		Philippe Garrel	France
Sansho the Bailiff (1954)	山椒大夫	Kenji Mizoguchi	Japan

=== Robert Mitchum Retrospective ===
The following film were selected to be screened:

Title	Director(s)	Production Country
Angel Face (1953)	Otto Preminger	United States
Blood on the Moon (1948)	Robert Wise	United States
Cape Fear (1962)	J. Lee Thompson	United States
Cape Fear (1991)	Martin Scorsese	United States
Crossfire (1947)	Edward Dmytryk	United States
Dead Man (1995)	Jim Jarmusch	United States, Germany, Japan
El Dorado (1966)	Howard Hawks	United States
Farewell, My Lovely (1975)	Dick Richards	United Kingdom, United States
The Friends of Eddie Coyle (1973)	Peter Yates	United States
His Kind of Woman (1951)	John Farrow	United States
Home from the Hill (1960)	Vincente Minnelli	United States
The Lusty Men (1952)	Nicholas Ray	United States
Macao (1952)	Josef von Sternberg, Nicholas Ray	United States
Nice Girls Don't Stay for Breakfast (2017)	Bruce Weber	United States
The Night of the Hunter (1955)	Charles Laughton	United States
Out of the Past (1947)	Jacques Tourneur	United States
Pursued (1947)	Raoul Walsh	United States
River of No Return (1954)	Otto Preminger	United States
The Story of G.I. Joe (1945)	William Wellman	United States
Till the End of Time (1946)	Edward Dmytryk	United States
Thunder Road (1958)	Arthur Ripley	United States
Track of the Cat (1954)	William Wellman	United States
Undercurrent (1946)	Vincente Minnelli	United States
The Wonderful Country (1959)	Robert Parrish	United States
The Yakuza (1975)	Sydney Pollack	United States, Japan

=== Shorts ===
The following short films were selected to be screened:

English title	Original title	Director(s)	Production Country
All Over the Place		Mariana Sanguinetti	Argentina
Birthday		Alberto Viavattene	Italy
Bonboné		Rakan Mayasi	Palestine, Lebanon
The Brick House		Eliane Esther Bots	Netherlands
Cheer Up Baby		Adinah Dancyger	United States
Creswick		Natalie Erika James	Australia
Cucli		Xavier Marrades	Spain
The Disinherited	Los Desheredados	Laura Ferrés	Spain
Douggy		Matvey Fiks	United States, Russia
Drip Drop		Jonna Nilsson	Sweden
A Gentle Night		Qiu Yang	China
Hedgehog's Home		Eva Cvijanović	Canada, Croatia
Hitchhiker		Damien Power	Australia
Hombre		Juan Pablo Arias Muñoz	Chile
The Last Light		Angelita Mendoza	United States, Mexico
The Layover		Ashley Connor, Joe Stankus	United States
Mr. Yellow Sweatshirt		Pacho Velez, Yoni Brook	United States
My Nephew Emmett		Kevin Wilson, Jr.	United States
Program		Gabriel de Urioste	United States
The Road to Magnasanti		John Wilson	United States
Scaffold		Kazik Radwanski	Canada
The True Tales	Une histoire vraie	Lucien Monot	Switzerland
Two	Due	Riccardo Giacconi	Italy, France
Unpresidented		Jason Giampietro	United States
