= Theresienstadt family camp =

Section of Auschwitz II-Birkenau concentration camp

Coordinates: 50°02′09″N 19°10′42″E

- Concentration camp
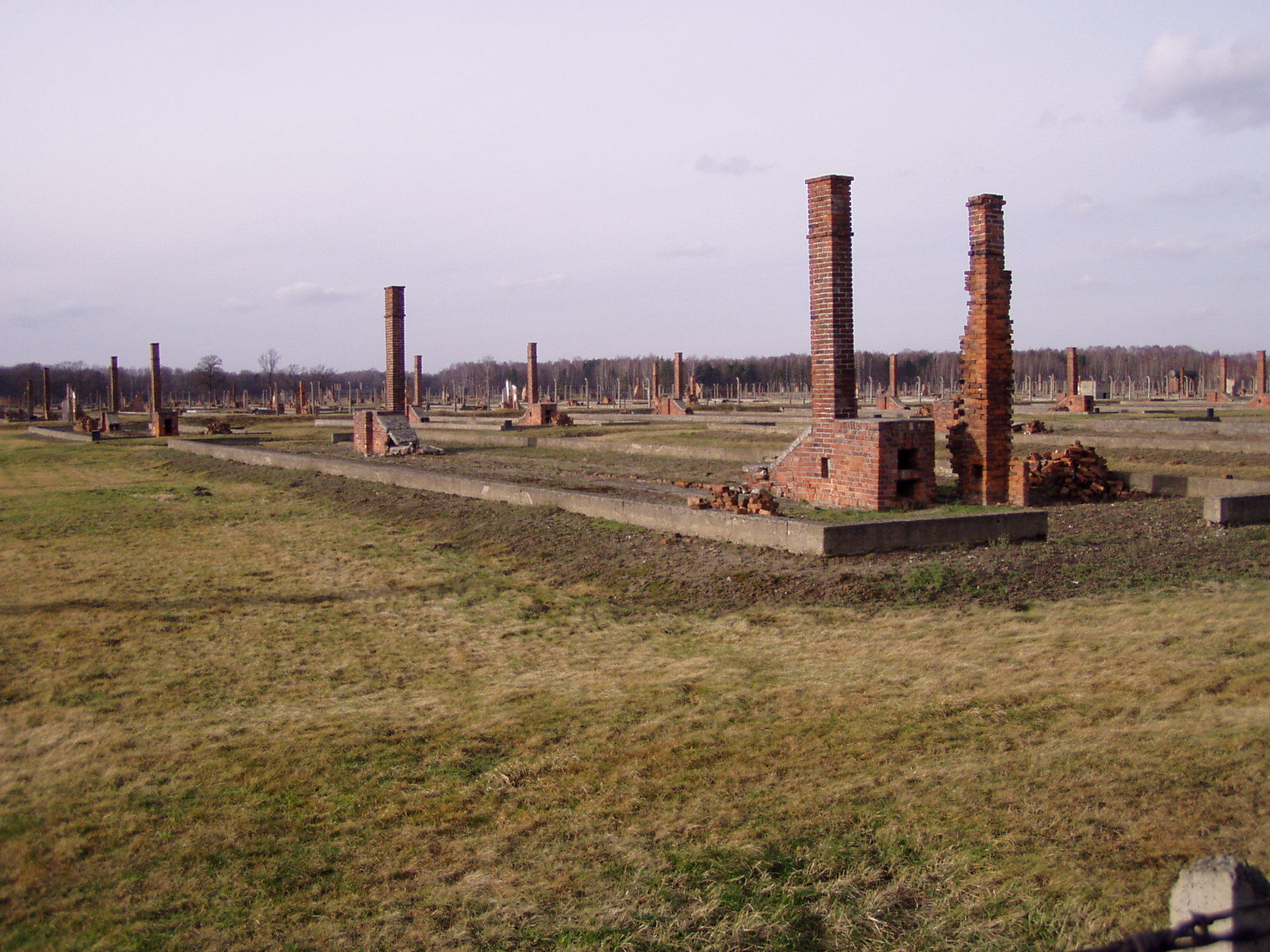
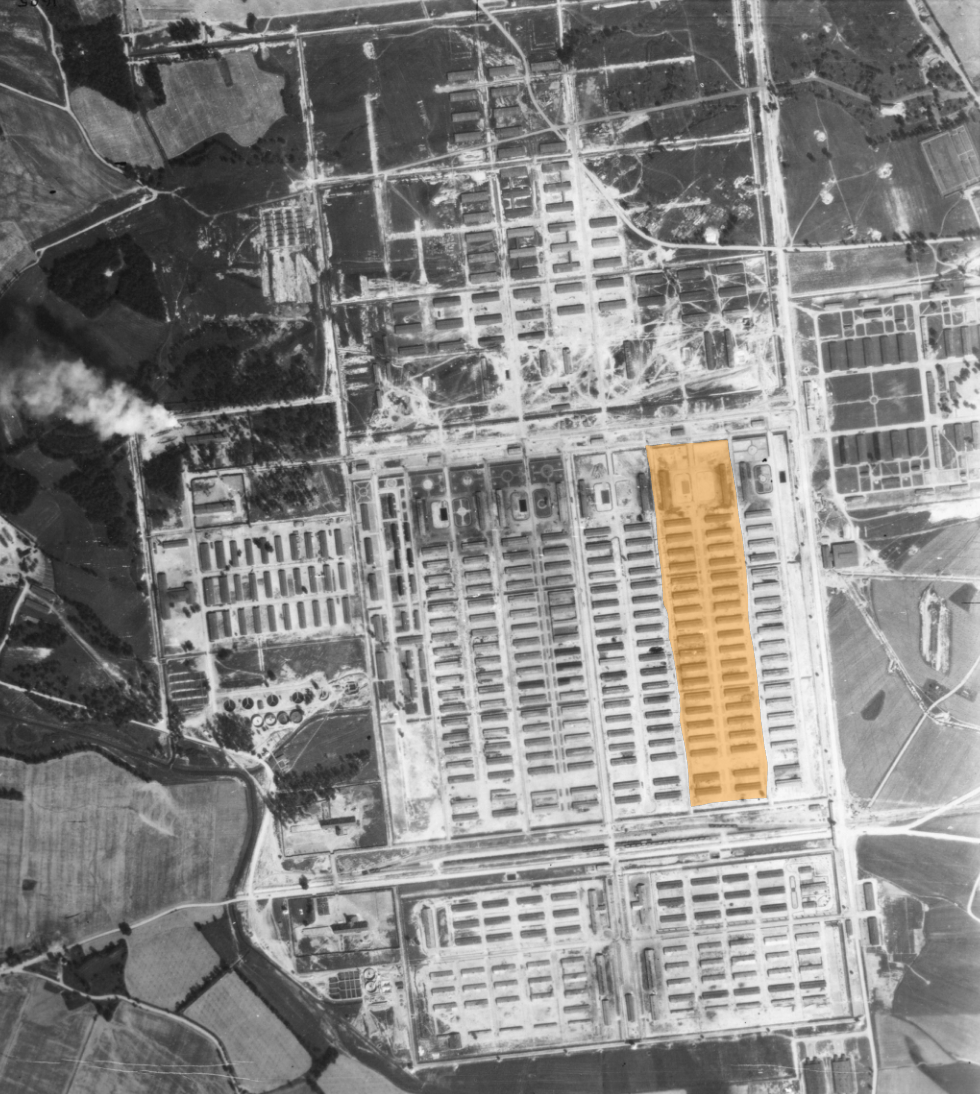
- Ruins of BIIb BIIb highlighted on an aerial photograph of Auschwitz II-Birkenau
- Known for: Largest massacre of Czechoslovak citizens in history
- Location: Auschwitz II-Birkenau
- Commandant: Fritz Buntrock
- Operational: 8 September 1943 – 12 July 1944
- Inmates: Jews
- Number of inmates: 17,517
- Killed: 14,000
- Notable inmates: Fredy Hirsch, Dina Babbitt, Otto Dov Kulka, Yehuda Bacon, Zuzana Růžičková

The Theresienstadt family camp (Czech: Terezínský rodinný tábor, German: Theresienstädter Familienlager), also known as the Czech family camp, consisted of a group of Jewish inmates from the Theresienstadt Ghetto in Czechoslovakia, who were held in the BIIb section of the Auschwitz II-Birkenau concentration camp from 8 September 1943 to 12 July 1944. The Germans created the camp to mislead the outside world about the Final Solution.

Deported from the ghetto in seven transports in September and December 1943, and May 1944, the prisoners were not subjected to selection on arrival, an unusual situation in Auschwitz, and were granted a number of "privileges", including the creation of a children's block that provided the only attempt at organized education at Auschwitz. The living conditions nevertheless remained poor and the mortality rate was high. Most of the inhabitants who did not die of starvation or disease were murdered during the camp liquidations on 8–9 March and 10–12 July 1944. The first liquidation was the largest massacre of Czechoslovak citizens in history. Of the 17,517 Jews deported to the family camp, only 1,294 survived the war.

== Background ==
Established in late 1941, the Theresienstadt Ghetto functioned in part as a transit center for Jews from Czechoslovakia, Germany and Austria on their way to extermination camps and other mass killing centers. The first transport of Jews from Theresienstadt to Auschwitz occurred on 26 October 1942, after 42,005 prisoners had been deported elsewhere. (Note: Prior to the 26 October 1942 transport, 42,005 Theresienstadt prisoners had been deported to ghettos and extermination, especially the Minsk Ghetto, Treblinka, and the Lublin Reservation (from which most were sent to Bełżec and Sobibór). Only 356 of these deportees survived. After 26 October, 46,101 people were deported from Theresienstadt to Auschwitz and only 90 to other camps.) Of the 7,001 people who were deported to Auschwitz from Theresienstadt in January and February 1943, 5,600 were immediately gassed and only 96 survived the war, despite the fact that the transports targeted able-bodied individuals who were intended as a labor detachment. For the next seven months, transports from Theresienstadt were halted on SS leader Heinrich Himmler's orders. Previously and apparently for different reasons, the SS had established a "Gypsy camp" at the BIIe section inside Auschwitz II-Birkenau where Romani and Sinti families were kept together and non-productive individuals were temporarily allowed to remain alive.

There is no surviving document indicating the SS reasoning for establishing the family camp, and it is a subject debated by scholars. It is probable that the family camp prisoners were kept alive so that their letters could reassure relatives in Theresienstadt and elsewhere that "deportation to the East" did not mean death. At the time, the SS was planning a Red Cross visit to Theresienstadt, and may have wanted to convince the International Committee of the Red Cross (ICRC) that deported Jews were not murdered. The family camp also served as a destination for those deported from Theresienstadt to ease overcrowding, which the ICRC inspectors would have noticed. Israeli historian Yehuda Bauer suggests that possibly the prisoners of the family camp were being used as hostages pending a successful outcome of Nazi–Jewish negotiations, similar to a transport of 1,200 children from the Białystok Ghetto, who were held at Theresienstadt for six weeks before being murdered on 7 October 1943 at Auschwitz, but the only evidence of this is circumstantial. (Note: Early in 1943, Swiss diplomat Anton Feldscher forwarded a British proposal to the German Foreign Office to allow 5,000 Jewish children to relocate from the General Government to Palestine via Sweden. Himmler agreed to this in principle but demanded the release of young German prisoners of war, which the Allied governments could not agree to, so the proposal was shelved. Simultaneously, the Working Group, an underground Jewish organization in the Slovak State, was engaged in large-scale efforts to bribe Nazi officials into allowing the rescue of Jews. According to Bauer, it is possible that the family camp was connected with the efforts of Feldscher or the Working Group, and the circumstantial evidence suggests this, but there is no proof.)

Some researchers have suggested that the SS planned an ICRC visit to the family camp at Birkenau to deceive the outside world about the true purpose of Auschwitz. When Himmler granted permission for ICRC representatives to visit Theresienstadt, he also granted permission for a visit to a "Jewish labor camp", believed by Czech historian Miroslav Kárný and Israeli historians Otto Dov Kulka and Nili Keren to refer to the family camp at Birkenau. Kárný, who witnessed the "beautification" of Theresienstadt prior to the Red Cross visit, wrote that the Nazis could have concealed the nature of Birkenau from Red Cross visitors. (Note: Miroslav Kárný observes that the SS did not stop the operation of the gas chambers for the 29 September 1944 visit of ICRC representative Maurice Rossel to Auschwitz I. On that day, more than 1,000 people were gassed and their bodies subsequently cremated; Rossel later said that he did not notice.) However, others believe that the poor physical condition of the inmates would make it clear that they were being mistreated.

== Establishment ==
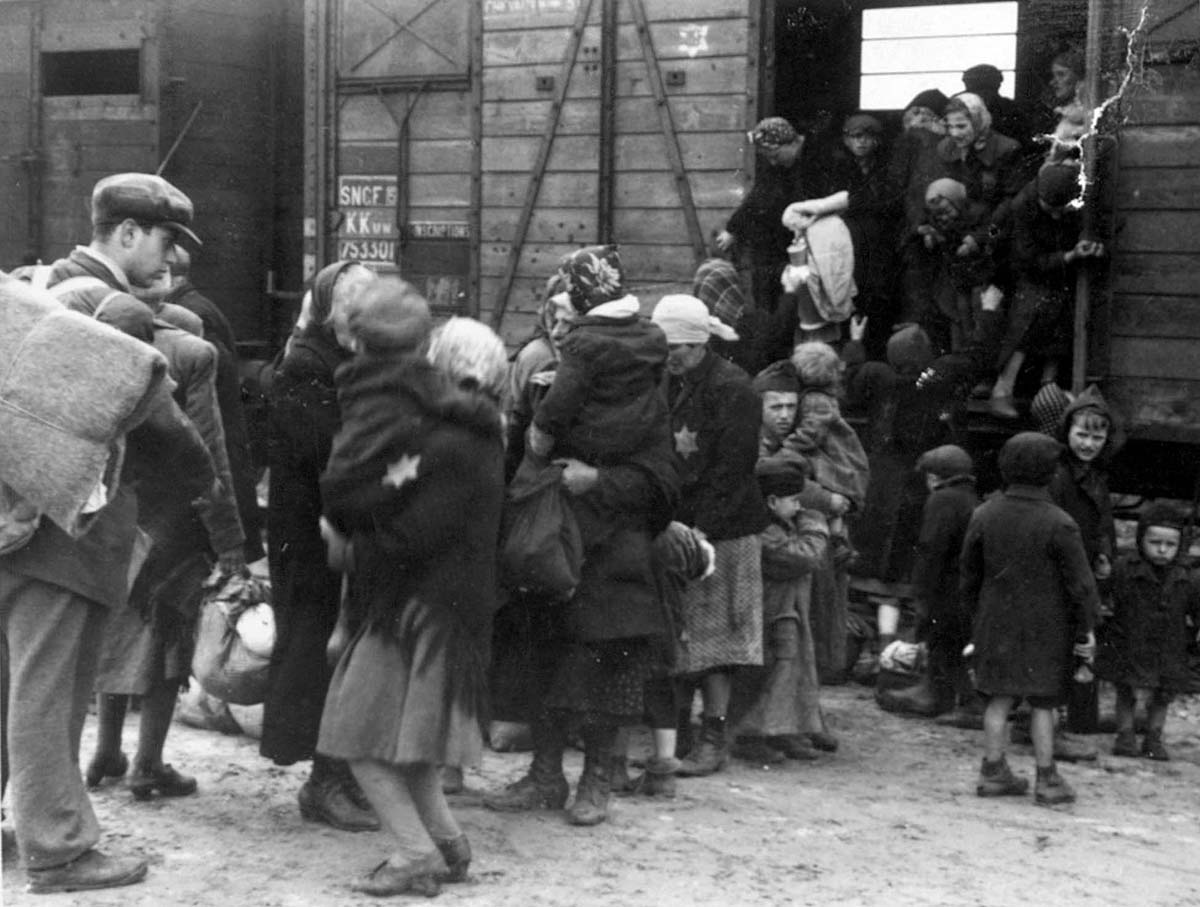
Carpathian Ruthenian Jews arrive at Birkenau, May 1944

During August 1943, rumors circulated in Theresienstadt of a resumption in deportations. On 3 September in the "Daily Orders" of the Jewish self-administration, it was announced that 5,000 people would be deported three days later—the largest number so far on a single day. Unlike previous transports, the selection was not done by the Transport Department of the Jewish self-administration, but by SS commandant Anton Burger directly. Prisoners who had previously held exemptions from deportation, such as the Aufbaukommando, the work detail that arrived at Theresienstadt first, as well as 150 members of the disbanded Ghetto Guard were included on the transport. The bulk of the transport consisted of young Czech Jews whom Himmler feared might organize an uprising inside the ghetto, as had already occurred in the Warsaw Ghetto, and their families. The transport was almost entirely Czech; out of 5,000 deportees there were 124 German, 83 Austrian and 11 Dutch Jews. Previous transports had departed to an undisclosed location in the "East", but in this case the Jews were told that they were to be sent to Birkenau to establish a work camp supposedly called the "Arbeitslager Birkenau bei Neu-Berun". Leading figures in the self-administration, including Leo Janowitz, secretary of the Council of Elders, and Fredy Hirsch, deputy leader of the Youth Welfare Office, were included in the transport to help govern the new camp.

On 6 September, two transports carrying 5,007 Jews departed at 14:00 and 20:00 from Bauschowitz train station; they arrived at Auschwitz II-Birkenau two days later. (Note: From the September transports, one person died in transit. The remaining 2,293 men and 2,713 women were given the numbers 146694–148986 and 58471–61183 respectively. Of the deportees, 918 were older than 60 and 290 children younger than 15 years.) There was no selection; no one was sent to the gas chambers. All were tattooed and registered into the camp by the Political Department, but in contrary to standard procedure, they kept their clothes and were not shaved. The inhabitants of the family camp were required to write to their relatives at Theresienstadt and to those not yet deported in order to mislead the outside world about the Final Solution; strict censorship prevented them from passing on accurate information. They had to give up their luggage and clothing, but were given civilian clothes that had been stolen from previous arrivals. The prisoners' records were marked "SB6", which meant that they were to be murdered 6 months after their arrival.

In December, two additional transports carrying 5,007 people (Note: Of the 5,007 people deported in December, 43 died on the Holocaust trains before arriving at Auschwitz. 2,491 people arrived at Auschwitz on 16 December; 981 males were assigned the numbers 168154–169134 while 1,510 females were assigned the numbers 70513–72019 and 72028–72030. 2,473 prisoners arrived on 20 December: 1,137 males, who were assigned the numbers 169969–171105; and 1,336 females, who were assigned the numbers 72435–73700.) arrived from Theresienstadt; the new arrivals were treated in the same way and held in the family camp. These transports also carried targeted the same demographic as the previous transport; 88.5% of its victims were Czech Jews. Several leaders in the Theresienstadt self-administration were in the December transport, having been deported as punishment for allegedly aiding escapees or committing other misconduct. The accusations were leveled by Anton Burger, the commandant of Theresienstadt, who disliked Jakob Edelstein, the Jewish elder. Deported to Auschwitz on 15 December, Edelstein was held at Block 11 in Auschwitz I.

== Conditions ==
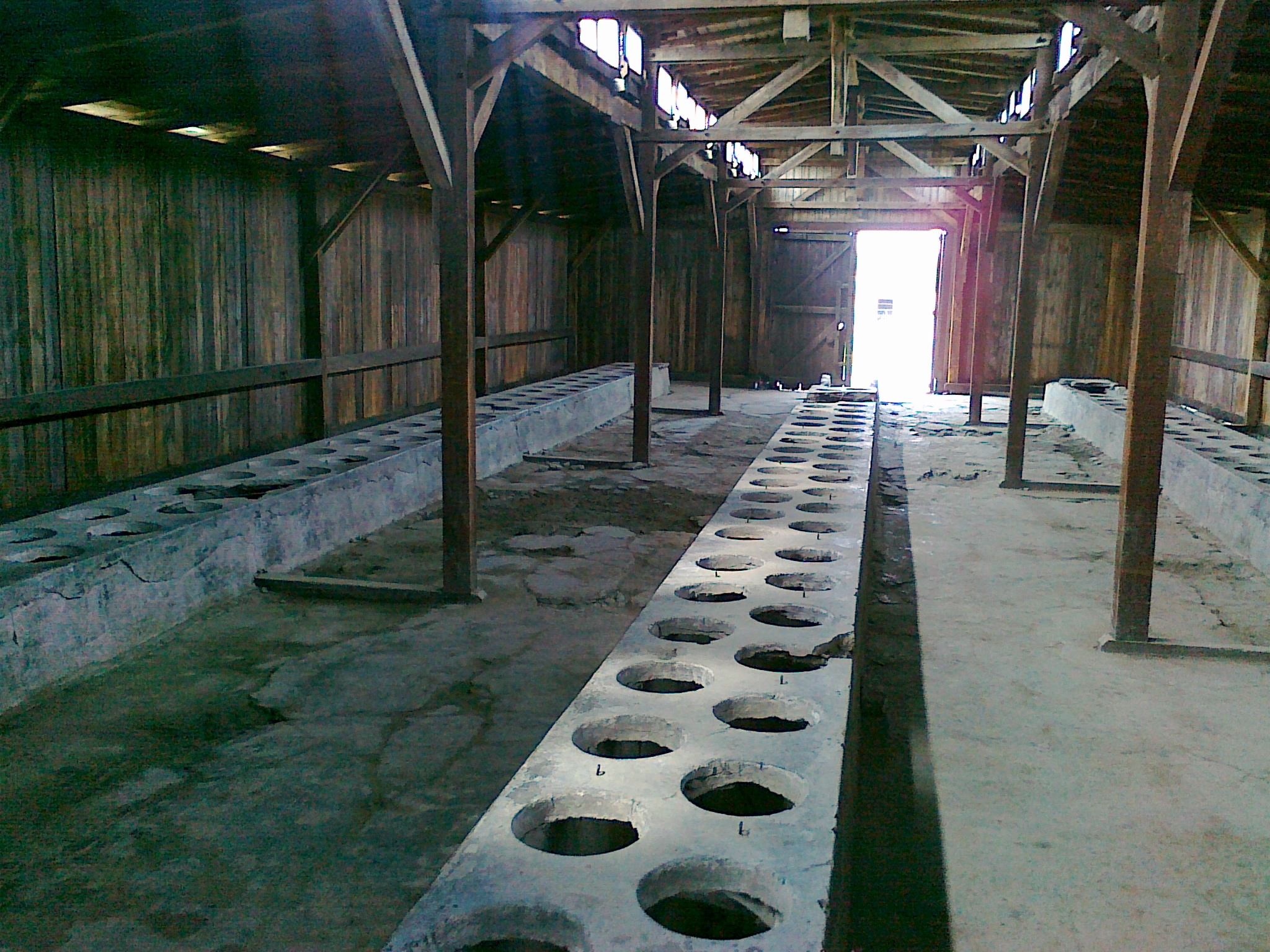
Latrines at Birkenau

The SS leader in charge of the section was SS-Unterscharführer Fritz Buntrock, who was known for his cruelty and sentenced to death after the war. The Lagerältester (head kapo) in the camp was a German convicted murderer named Arno Böhm. When Böhm joined the SS in March 1944, he was replaced by another German criminal named Wilhelm Brachmann. Brachmann was also a criminal prisoner, but his offense was petty theft and he attempted to help the Jewish prisoners where he could. Initially, the block leaders in the camp were Polish prisoners who were brutalized from having spent years in Auschwitz. Later, when the September arrivals had learned to be cruel to each other, the most brutal were appointed block leaders.

Miroslav Kárný noted that the camp's conditions were described favorably by Auschwitz prisoners in other parts of the camp, but very harshly by prisoners of the family camp itself. He believes that the latter perception is more accurate because the overall mortality rate from "natural" camp deaths was the same at the family camp as the rest of Birkenau. The mortality was to the same causes: hunger, disease, poor sanitation, hypothermia, and exhaustion. Of the September arrivals, 1140 (about 25%) died in the first six months. BIIb was only 600 by 150 metres (1,970 by 490 ft), "a narrow, muddy strip surrounded by an electric fence", in the words of the Terezín Initiative. Unlike other Jewish prisoners at Auschwitz, they were allowed to receive packages, which they received from the ICRC in Switzerland, as well as friends and relatives in the Czech lands. However, few packages reached their intended recipients, having been stolen by the SS. A few children were born at the camp. Sanitary conditions were particularly poor, since there were only three latrines, each with three concrete slabs with 132 holes. The latrines were also used as clandestine meeting places for families, as it was the only place to get away from the SS.

Although BIIb was only a few hundred meters from the gas chambers and crematoria, these were not actually visible from the section. Of the 32 barracks, 28 were used for housing; barracks 30 and 32 were infirmaries; 31 was the children's barracks; and one barrack was used for a weaving factory in which women were forced to sew machine-gun belts. Women were housed in odd numbered barracks and men in even numbered barracks, which were located opposite the path that led down the center of the section. When the September transports arrived, the barracks were not complete, and most inmates worked inside the camp on construction. Prisoners were awoken at 5 am and had thirty minutes to get ready before the Appell (roll call); after work they had only an hour that they were allowed to spend with their families before the evening roll call. Women were regularly subjected to sexual assault by SS guards.

== Children's barracks ==
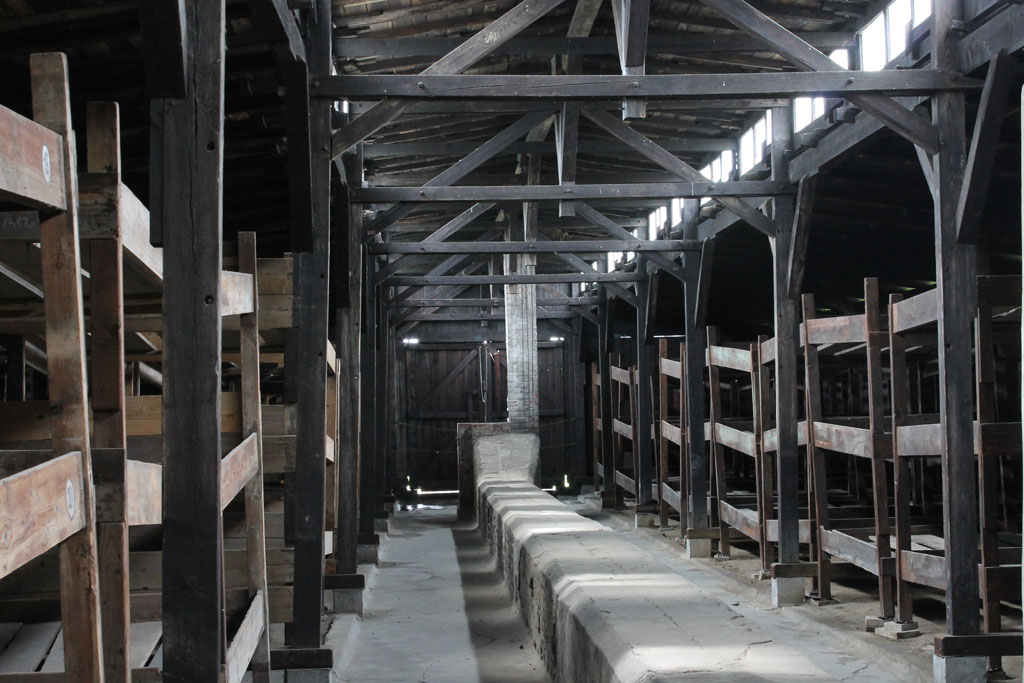
Reconstructed barracks

Hirsch persuaded Arno Böhm to allocate a barracks, Block 31, for children younger than fourteen, and became the overseer of this barracks. In this arrangement, the children lived with their parents at night and spent the day at the special barracks. Hirsch persuaded the guards that it would be in their interest to have the children learn German. Based on the children's homes at Theresienstadt, Hirsch organized an education system intended to preserve the children's morale. Children were awoken early for breakfast and calisthenics, and received six hours of instruction daily in small groups, segregated by age, led by teachers recruited from youth workers at Theresienstadt. The subjects taught included history, music, and Judaism, in Czech, as well as a few German phrases to recite at inspections.

Because there were only twelve books and almost no supplies, the teachers had to recite lessons from memory, often based on imagination and storytelling. The children's lack of education—they had been excluded from school even before their deportation—made their task more difficult. A chorus rehearsed regularly; a children's opera was performed; and supplies were scrounged in order to decorate the walls of the barracks, which were painted with Disney characters by Dina Gottliebová. A production of Five Minutes in Robinson's Kingdom, a Czech adaptation of Robinson Crusoe written by one of the carers, was rehearsed and performed. Children played concentration camp-related games, such as "Lagerältester and Blockältester", "Appell" (roll call), and even "gas chamber". Because the block was so orderly, it was shown off to SS men who worked in other parts of the camp. SS men who directly participated in the extermination process, especially Josef Mengele, visited frequently and helped organize better food for the children.

Using his influence with the Germans, Hirsch obtained better food for the children, including food parcels addressed to prisoners who had died. The soup for the children was thicker than for other prisoners; allegedly it was from the Gypsy camp and contained semolina. SS men provided the children with sugar, jam, and occasionally even white bread or milk. He also convinced the Germans to hold roll call inside the barracks, so the children were spared the hours-long ordeal of standing outside in all weather. After the arrival of the December transport, there were about 700 children in the family camp. Hirsch was able to obtain a second barracks for children aged three to eight so that the older children could prepare a performance of Snow White, which the SS had requested; it was performed on 23 January with many SS men, including Mengele, in attendance. By imposing strict discipline on the children, Hirsch made sure that there were no acts of violence or theft, otherwise common in concentration camps. He organized soccer and softball games. Hirsch's strictness about the children's hygiene—he insisted that they wash daily even in the frigid winter of 1943–44 and carried out regular inspections for lice—reduced mortality rates; almost no children died before the liquidation.

Hirsch, who died in the first liquidation of 8–9 March, had appointed Josef Lichtenstein as his successor; the educators attempted to restore a sense of normality to the remaining children despite their knowledge of what would happen to them. In April 1944, children celebrated an improvised Passover Seder. A mixed choir of 300 children and adults sang sections of Ludwig van Beethoven's Symphony No. 9, including the lyrics that "all men are brothers". By May, children lived separately from their parents.

== Liquidation ==
=== First liquidation ===
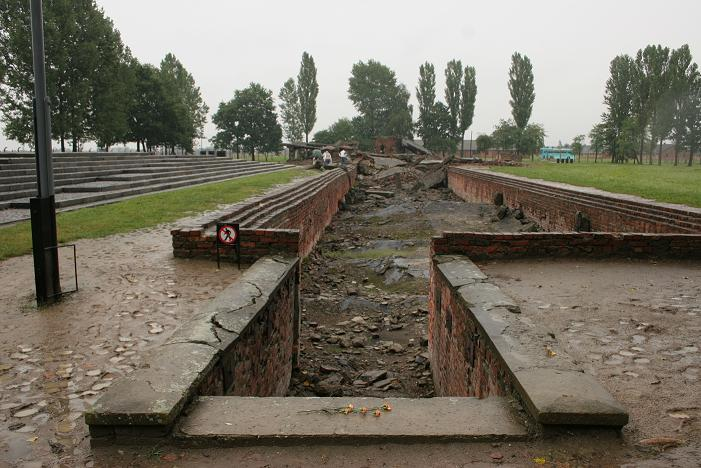
Ruins of Crematorium II

In February 1944, a delegation visited from the Reich Security Main Office and the German Red Cross. The visitors were most interested in the children's barracks, the only attempt to organize education at Auschwitz. The most notable visitor, Adolf Eichmann, commented favorably about the cultural activity of the children at Birkenau. The Auschwitz resistance informed Hirsch and other leaders at the family camp in advance that liquidation was imminent. Before the liquidation, there were about 8,000 surviving prisoners in the family camp, of whom the September arrivals were a bit less than half.

The commandant of Auschwitz II-Birkenau, SS-Obersturmführer Johann Schwarzhuber, visited the camp on 5 March and told the September arrivals that they were soon to be transported to Heydebreck to found a new labor camp. The prisoners were ordered to fill in postcards dated 25 March for their relatives in Theresienstadt; the postdating was a routine practice allowing for the time required for censorship. In these letters, they requested that their relatives send them packages with food. On 6 March, Schwarzhuber ordered the registration of all September prisoners for assignment to work details; the heads of each detail were even appointed. Contradictory rumors circulated, either that the prisoners would all be killed or that the Nazi promises were real. The next day, the SS ordered the prisoners to stay in their barracks after the morning Appell to separate the September from December arrivals. In the meantime, the prisoners of the adjacent quarantine block (BIIa) were removed, except for an Austrian doctor, Otto Wolken, and the block clerk, Rudolf Vrba.

From the family camp, first the men and later the women were moved to the quarantine block; they were allowed to bring all belongings and it appears most were deceived into thinking this was simply another move. December prisoners aided the elderly and ill during the move, which was completed by 17:00. Patients in the infirmary were not moved to the quarantine block because the Nazis wanted to maintain the deception and avoid panic. Erich Kulka managed to hide his wife and son Otto Dov Kulka there, saving their lives. Some SS men also saved their Jewish girlfriends by moving them temporarily to other parts of the camp.

Vrba visited Hirsch on the morning of 8 March to inform him about the preparations for the liquidation of the family camp and to urge him to lead an uprising. Hirsch asked for an hour to think, and when Vrba returned, Hirsch was in a coma. It is disputed if he committed suicide, or was poisoned by doctors who had been promised survival by Mengele. The Nazis entered the quarantine block to remove eleven pairs of twins (for use in Nazi human experimentation), doctors, and the artist Dina Gottliebová on the afternoon of 8 March. About 60 or 70 people from the September transports were not killed; 38 of these survived the war. At 8 pm on 8 March, a strict curfew was imposed and the quarantine block was surrounded by half a company of SS men and their dogs. Two hours later, twelve covered trucks arrived and the men were ordered to board them. They left their belongings behind, assured that the possessions would be transported separately. In order to maintain the deception, the trucks turned right, towards the train station, instead of left, towards the gas chambers. After the men were driven to Crematorium III, the women were trucked to Crematorium II. This process took several hours; when frightened Jews in one barracks began to sing at 2 am, the SS fired warning shots at them. Even the undressing rooms were camouflaged so that the Jews did not realize their fate until they were given the order to undress. According to Sonderkommando prisoners, they sang the Czech national anthem, Hatikvah, and the Internationale before entering the gas chambers. In total, 3,791 or 3,792 people were murdered.

=== Further developments ===
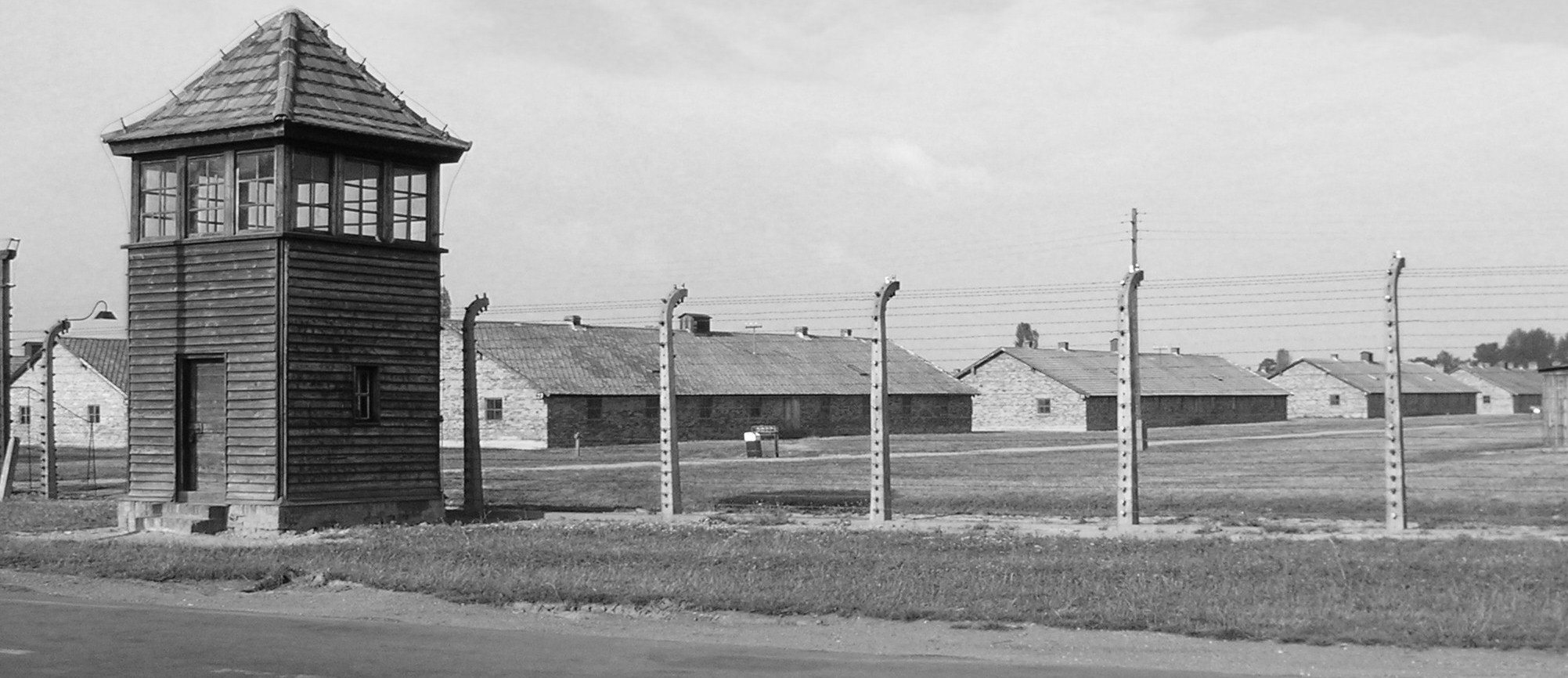
Auschwitz barracks and fence

After the liquidation, the remaining prisoners expected that they would be murdered in a similar fashion. By this time, it was evident to the prisoners that the Germans were going to lose the war and some hoped for a swift Allied victory before their six months had elapsed. The caretakers of the children continued with the lessons only to give them one more day of happiness and distract the children from their eventual fate. According to survivor Hanna Hoffman, the rate of suicide increased as the date of liquidation approached for the December arrivals; people killed themselves by approaching the electric wire, at which point they were usually shot by SS guards. One notable event during this period was the escape of Siegfried Lederer, a Czech Jew and block elder in the family camp, with Viktor Pestek, a Romanian Volksdeutscher SS guard, on 7 April. Lederer attempted to alert the outside world to the plight of prisoners in the family camp and to organize armed resistance at Theresienstadt, but both efforts failed.

=== News reports ===
The family camp was mentioned in an article on page nine of the Jewish Chronicle in London on 25 February 1944: "There are also 7,000 Czechoslovak Jews in the camp. They had been deported to Birkenau last summer." On 9 June, the official newspaper of the Polish government-in-exile reported prominently that 7,000 Czech Jews had been murdered in the gas chambers at Auschwitz, and that they had been forced to write postdated postcards to their families. These allegations were confirmed days later by the dissemination of the Vrba–Wetzler report, which provided more detail on the Jews in the family camp and their fate. On 14 June, Jaromír Kopecký, a Czechoslovak diplomat in Switzerland, passed a copy of the report to the ICRC; the report mentioned the first liquidation of the family camp and that the remaining detainees were scheduled to be murdered on 20 June.

The Czechoslovak government-in-exile pressed the BBC and American radio to publicize news of the family camp in the hope of preventing the murder of the remaining inmates. The BBC European Service broadcast the information on its German service's women's programme on 16 June 1944 at noon, warning the Germans that they would be held responsible:

News has reached London that the German authorities in Czechoslovak [sic] have ordered the massacre of 3,000 Czechoslovak Jews in gas chambers at Birkenau on or about June 20th. ... 4,000 Czechoslovak Jews who were taken from Theresienstadt to Birkenau in September 1943 were massacred in the gas chambers on March 7th.

The German authorities in Czechoslovakia and their subordinates should know that full information is received in London about the massacres in Birkenau. All those responsible for such massacres from top downwards will be called to account.

Michael Fleming writes that there was probably a broadcast before 16 June too, because the BBC's news directive that day said: "Report again our warning the Germans about the massacres of Czech Jews." According to Polish historian Danuta Czech, these reports probably delayed the liquidation of the camp until July.

=== ICRC visit ===
In November 1943, the ICRC had requested permission to visit Theresienstadt. In preparation for the visit, the SS ran a "beautification" program that included deporting an additional 7,503 people to Auschwitz in May 1944 to ease overcrowding. Most of the new arrivals were German-speaking; only 2,543 were from the Protectorate. (Note: Victims from the 15 May transport were given the numbers A-76–A-842 (to 707 men and boys) and A-15–A-999 and A-2000–A-2750 (to 1,736 women and girls). The 16 May transport was given the numbers A-843–A-1418 (the 576 men and boys) and A-1000–A-1999 and A-2751–A-3621 (the 1,871 women and girls). The third transport received the numbers A-1445–A-2506 (the 1,062 men and boys) and A-3642–A-5078 (the 1,437 women and girls). The composition of the three May transports: By age: 511 children fourteen and younger, 3601 adults up to sixty, 3,391 elderly; By nationality: 3,125 German Jews, 2,543 Czech Jews, 1,276 Austrian Jews, 559 Dutch Jews.; According to Adler, this and future transports had more surviving non-Czech than Czech Jews.) These new arrivals were treated in the same way as the earlier arrivals had been, but the family camp became very crowded and there was not time to integrate the new arrivals before the second liquidation. On 23 June 1944, ICRC representative Maurice Rossel and two Danish officials visited Theresienstadt. Their visit was carefully choreographed by the SS, and Rossel reported erroneously that Theresienstadt was the final destination of deported Jews. As a result, according to Kárný and Kulka, the ICRC did not press for a visit to Birkenau and the SS no longer had a use for the family camp.

=== Second liquidation ===
Late in June, the December arrivals expected to be taken away to be murdered, but nothing happened, except to relatives of Jakob Edelstein, who were removed. On 20 June, Edelstein witnessed the murder of his family before being killed himself. The summer of 1944 was the height of mass murder at Auschwitz, and the liquidation of the family camp coincided with the murder of more than 300,000 Hungarian Jews from May to early July 1944.

The increasing need for labor for the German war industry prevented the later transports from being completely liquidated as people of the September transports had been. On 1 or 2 July, Mengele returned to the camp and began to conduct a selection. The prisoners stripped to the waist and passed one-by-one past SS doctors. Healthy individuals between the ages of 16 and 45 were selected to live and removed to other parts of the camp. SS men forced girls and women to undress and jump up and down to prove their fitness; many claimed to possess useful skills such as gardening or sewing. Mothers could live if they separated from their children, but, according to Ruth Bondy, almost all chose to remain behind. Some older children got through the selection by lying about their age or returning to be selected a second time after being sent to the left. Others chose to remain behind with their parents.

Later, Johann Schwarzhuber held a selection in the boys' barracks to separate those between fourteen and sixteen years of age, although some younger boys managed to get through. Hermann Langbein credited Fredy Hirsch for posthumously bringing this about, stating that the SS visits to the children's block had caused them to become sympathetic to the children. Even brutal SS guards who were later convicted of murder tried to spare the children's lives, because they had attended the theater performances. Otto Dov Kulka, then eleven, was saved by Fritz Buntrock, a guard notorious for beating inmates. About eighty or ninety boys were selected to live. However, efforts by SS guard Stefan Baretzki and others to spare some of the girls were blocked by the SS physician Franz Lucas. In all, about 3,500 people were removed from BIIb; the remaining 6,500 inmates were murdered in the gas chambers between 10 and 12 July 1944.

Of those who survived the selection, 2,000 women were sent to Stutthof concentration camp or camps near Hamburg while 1,000 men were sent to Sachsenhausen. The boys remained at Auschwitz, in block BIId of the men's camp. Two-thirds later died by extermination through labor or during the death marches; only 1,294 prisoners of the family camp survived the war. In September and October 1944, the block was used to house Polish prisoners who had been transported from a transit camp in Pruszków, mostly civilians captured during the Warsaw Uprising. From November, it housed female prisoners from BIb.

== Legacy ==
The liquidation of the camp on 8–9 March was the largest mass murder of Czechoslovak citizens during World War II. However, for many years the story of the family camp was almost unknown outside the Czech Jewish community, receiving much less attention than crimes against non-Jewish Czechs, such as the Lidice massacre. Some survivors claimed that the liquidation had actually occurred on 7 March, on the birthday of Czech statesman Tomáš Garrigue Masaryk, or even that the SS had chosen the date for that reason. However, the fact that the event actually occurred on 8 March is "indisputable" according to Kárný, who doubted that the SS commandant would have known about Masaryk's birthday. On the fiftieth anniversary of the crime, the Terezín Initiative organized an international conference, publishing the conference papers as a book. In 2017, the Parliament of the Czech Republic officially recognized 9 March as a commemoration of the massacre. (Note: As of 2017, there are thirteen official "important days" (Czech: významný dny) in the Czech calendar, which are not public holidays and do not involve time off work. Five, including International Holocaust Remembrance Day and the anniversary of the Lidice massacre, are related to World War II.)

Reflecting on the final selection at the family camp, Israeli psychologist Deborah Kuchinsky and other survivors commented that instead of teaching children decency and generosity, the educators should have taught their charges to lie, cheat, and steal in order to survive. The family camp has been the focus of several literary memoirs by child survivors, including Ruth Klüger's Still Alive, Gerhard Durlacher's Stripes in the Sky, and Otto Dov Kulka's Landscapes of the Metropolis of Death.

== List of transports to the family camp ==
Source: Adler (2017, pp. 613–614, 616) and Czech (1990, pp. 483, 548, 551, 627–628) unless otherwise specified.

Departure	Arrival	Transport code	Number of prisoners	Survivors
6 September 1943	8 September	Dl	2479	38
6 September 1943	8 September	Dm	2528	38
15 December 1943	16 December	Dr	2504	262
18 December 1943	20 December	Ds	2503	443
15 May 1944	16 May	Dz	2503	119
16 May 1944	17 May	Ea	2500	5
18 May 1944	19 May	Eb	2500	261
Total			17,517	1,294
