= Ruth Elias =

Holocaust survivor (1922-2008)

- Born: Ruth Huppert; 6 October 1922; Moravian Ostrava, Czechoslovakia
- Died: 11 October 2008 (aged 86); Beit Yitzhak-Sha'ar Hefer, Israel

Ruth Elias (née Huppert; 6 October 1922 – 11 October 2008) was a Jewish woman who was born in Moravian Ostrava on 6 October 1922. Her parents were Friedrich (Fritz) Huppert and Malvina Ringer. Elias had an older sister, Edith (b. 1920). After the German annexation of Czechoslovakia, she was sent to the Theresienstadt ghetto, where she married and became pregnant. She was transported to Auschwitz concentration camp, where she disguised her pregnancy and was later selected for transfer to a labor camp in Hamburg, Germany, where she was discovered to be pregnant. An SS doctor had her transferred to Ravensbrück concentration camp and then back to Auschwitz. When Dr. Josef Mengele discovered she was pregnant, he let her give birth to see how long a baby could live without being fed. After a week, she injected her newborn baby girl with morphine, saving Ruth's life.

She subsequently went to Israel, where she wrote a memoir, Triumph of Hope. She died on 11 October 2008 at age 86 in Beit-Yitzhak-Sha'ar Hefer, Israel.

== Documentaries ==
- Heike Tauch: "Wann reden, wann schweigen. Ein Besuch bei Ruth und Kurt Elias in Beth Jitzchak" Deutschlandfunk 2007, 50 min
- Claude Lanzmann: Shoah: Four Sisters
