= Paul Eppstein =

German sociologist (1902–1944)

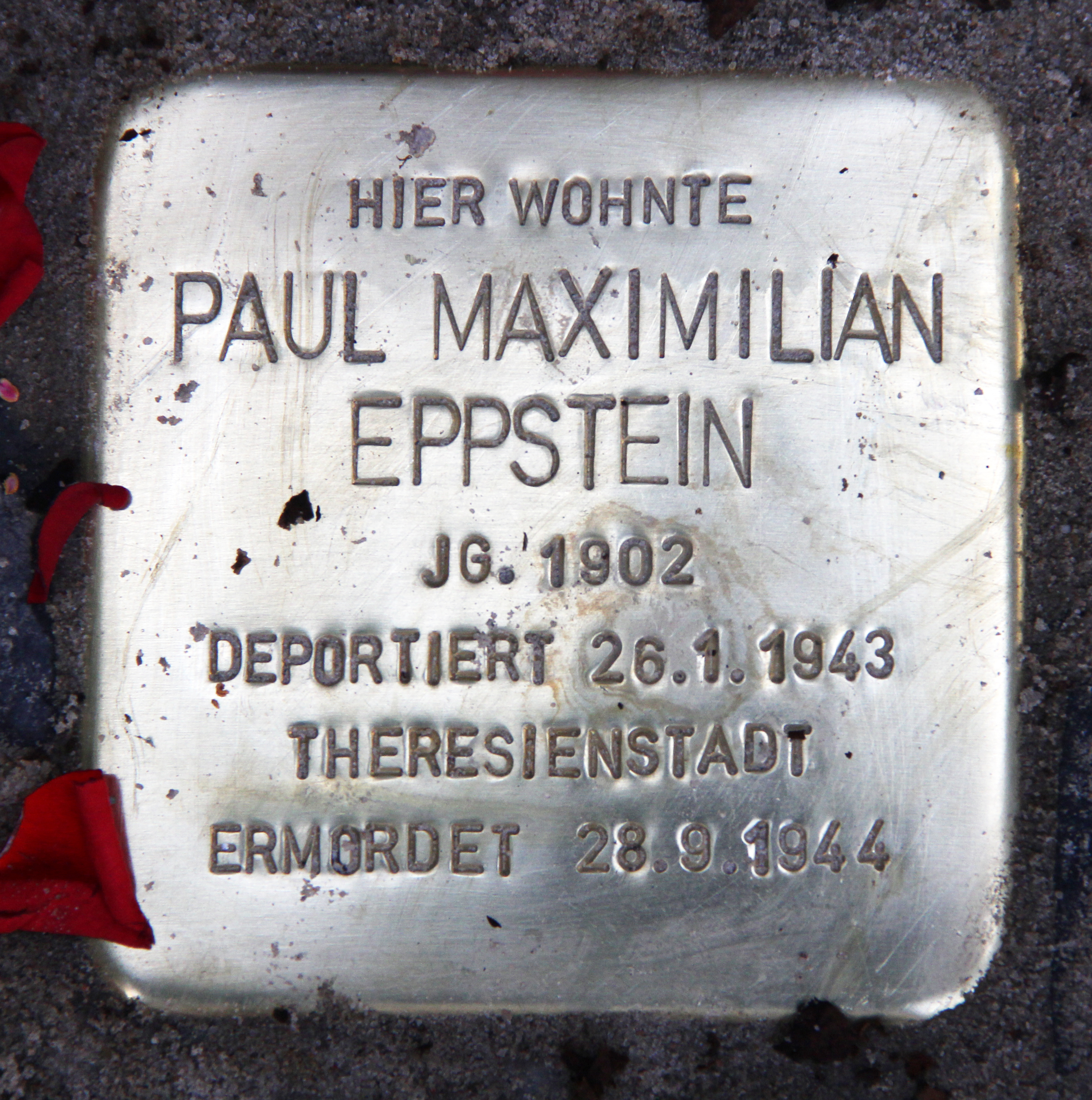
- "Stolperstein" (stumbling block), Ludwigkirchstraße 10a, Berlin-Wilmersdorf, Germany
- Born: 4 March 1902; Ludwigshafen am Rhein
- Died: 27 or 28 September 1944 (aged 42); Theresienstadt Ghetto, Theresienstadt, Protectorate of Bohemia and Moravia
- Spouse: Hedwig Strauss (m. 1930)
- Parent(s): Isidor Eppstein; Johanna Scharff

Academic background
- Education: University of Heidelberg
- Thesis: Der Durchschnitt als statistische Fiktion (1923)

Paul Maximilian Eppstein (4 March 1902 – 27 or 28 September 1944) was a German sociologist, Zionist and elder in the Theresienstadt Ghetto.

== Life ==
Paul Eppstein was the son of the traveling salesman Isidor Eppstein (1869–1916) and his wife Johanna, born Scharff (1874–1972). He spent his early childhood in Ludwigshafen am Rhein before the family moved to Mannheim in 1908. His brother Lothar was born in 1909 (died in 1977 in the US). After his father's death, the family moved back to Ludwigshafen in 1918. In 1920 he took his Abitur in Mannheim at the secondary school, then he studied law and political science, sociology and economics at the University of Heidelberg. He received his doctorate in 1924 from the Faculty of Philosophy, the topic of his dissertation: The average as statistical fiction.

In 1928 he became director of the Mannheim Adult Education Center, which in a few years developed into one of the most important institutes of this kind in Germany. On 14 August 1930, he married Dr. Hedwig Strauss (1903–1944). Eppstein taught sociology at the University for the Science of Judaism in Berlin in the 1930s. In 1933 he published the paperback "The Symptoms in Business Cycle Research".

In the same year he had to resign the management of the adult education center due to the rise of the Nazis. At the request of the board of the Reich Representation of German Jews in Berlin, he joined the latter, where he was mainly concerned with administrative issues and social tasks. After the November pogroms, Eppstein received an invitation from England to lecture in sociology, which he refused because he did not want to leave Germany. In the following period he was arrested several times by the Gestapo.

From July 1939 he worked in the Reich Association of Jews in Germany and had to appear several times in the Reich Security Main Office (RSHA) in the so-called Eichmann department. In late summer 1941, as representative of the Reich Association, together with Josef Löwenherz from the Vienna Israelite Community, Adolf Eichmann in the presence of Rolf Günther and Friedrich Suhr announced that in September 1941 all Jews in the Reich would be required to be labeled: As of 19 September the Star of David had to be worn by anyone who legally was considered a Jew.

In January 1943, he was deported to the Theresienstadt ghetto with his wife and Leo Baeck, where he was elected to succeed Jakob Edelstein as the elder (Judenältester). As such, he was forced, among other things, to prepare deportations to the extermination camps and lied to Maurice Rossel during the International Committee of the Red Cross June 1944 visit to the ghetto. On 27 or 28 September 1944, he was shot by SS men in the Small Fortress of Theresienstadt for alleged breaches of the law. His wife Hedwig was deported to Auschwitz on 28 October 1944, where she was also murdered.

== Literature ==
- John F. Oppenheimer (editor) u. a .: Lexicon of Judaism. 2nd Edition. Bertelsmann Lexikon Verlag, Gütersloh u. a. 1971, ISBN 3-570-05964-2, col. 187.
- Karl Otto Watzinger: History of the Jews in Mannheim 1650–1945. Kohlhammer, Stuttgart 1984, ISBN 3-17-008696-0, pp. 89–92.
- Israel Gutman (ed.): Encyclopedia of the Holocaust: The Persecution and Murder of European Jews. 3 volumes, Piper Verlag, Munich / Zurich 1998, ISBN 3-492-22700-7.
- Beate Meyer: Deadly Tightrope Walk: The Reich Association of Jews in Germany between Hope, Coercion, Self-Assertion and Entanglement (1939–1945). Göttingen 2011, ISBN 978-3-8353-0933-3.
- Wolfgang Benz: German Jews in the 20th Century: A Story in Portraits. Munich: Beck, 2011, ISBN 978-3-406-62292-2, therein: “Jewish elder” in Theresienstadt: Paul Eppstein, pp. 65–77
- Claus-Dieter Krohn: Eppstein, Paul. In: Harald Hagemann, Claus-Dieter Krohn (ed.): Biographical handbook of German-speaking economic emigration after 1933. Volume 1: Adler – Lehmann. Saur, Munich 1999, ISBN 3-598-11284-X, pp. 142–143.
- Eppstein, Paul, in: Joseph Walk (ed.): Short biographies on the history of the Jews 1918–1945. Munich: Saur, 1988, ISBN 3-598-10477-4, pp. 81f.
- Eppstein, Hedwig, in: Joseph Walk (ed.): Short biographies on the history of the Jews 1918-1945. Munich: Saur, 1988, ISBN 3-598-10477-4, p. 81
- Clary, David C., The Lost Scientists of World War II, World Scientific Publishing, 2024, ISBN 978-1-80061-491-8
