= Shoah: Four Sisters =

2017 French documentary film by Claude Lanzmann

- French: Les quatre soeurs
- Directed by: Claude Lanzmann
- Written by: Claude Lanzmann
- Produced by: David Frenkel
- Starring: Paula Biren; Ruth Elias; Ada Lichtman; Hanna Marton
- Cinematography: Dominique Chapuis
- Edited by: Chantal Hymans
- Music by: Jérémy Azoulay
- Production companies: CNC; Synecdoche
- Distributed by: Arte
- Release dates: 13 October 2017 (NYFF); 23 January 2018 (France)
- Running time: 273 minutes
- Country: France
- Languages: French; English; German; Hebrew

Shoah: Four Sisters (French: Les quatre soeurs) is a 2017 French documentary film by Claude Lanzmann, his final film prior to his death in 2018. A continuation of his acclaimed 1985 film Shoah, Four Sisters chronicles four women – Paula Biren, Ruth Elias, Ada Lichtman and Hanna Marton – who, after escaping the concentration camps, tried to find a life after the Holocaust. Lanzmann traveled around four Eastern European countries, interviewing and got accounts from four separate women.

It premiered at the 2017 New York Film Festival, and first aired on TV as a four-part series on January 23, 2018. Shoah: Four Sisters was shortlisted for France's entry in the Best Documentary Feature at the 91st Academy Awards.

== Box office ==
The movie opened Wednesday in New York City's Quad Cinema with a total of $474. The next day the movie increased 6% to $515, for a two-day total of $919. The film continued to post steadily increases through the weekend ($550 on Friday, $897 on Saturday, and $1,393 on Sunday) for a three-day total of $2,840 and a five-day total of $3,829. The movie therefore operated at a loss.
