= Jakob Edelstein =

Jewish elder of the Theresienstadt Ghetto (1903–1944)

Jewish elder of the Theresienstadt Ghetto
- In office 4 December 1941 – January 1943
- Preceded by: None
- Succeeded by: Paul Eppstein

Personal details
- Born: Jakob Edelstein; 25 July 1903 Horodenka, Kingdom of Galicia and Lodomeria, Austria-Hungary
- Died: 20 June 1944 (aged 40) Auschwitz-Birkenau, German-occupied Poland
- Spouse: Miriam Olinerova (m. 1931; died 1944)
- Children: 1
- Parent(s): Motl Edelstein; Mattil Edelstein
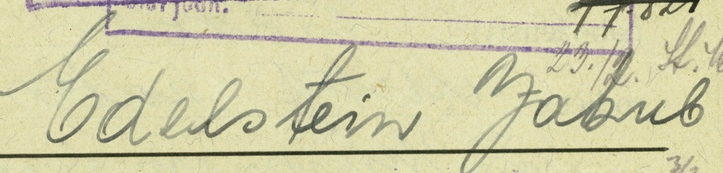
- Signature

Jakob Edelstein (also written as Yacov, Yaakov, Jakub Edelstein or Edlstein; 25 July 1903 – 20 June 1944) was a Czechoslovak Zionist, social democrat and the first Jewish Elder in the Theresienstadt ghetto. He was murdered in Auschwitz-Birkenau.

== Life and work ==
Jakob Edelstein was born into a devout Ashkenazi Jewish family in Horodenka, a city then part of the Austro-Hungarian Empire, nowadays in the Ivano-Frankivsk Oblast, Ukraine. His parents were Motl and Mattil Edelstein, and he had a sister called Dora.

In 1915, during World War I, the family fled Horodenka to Brno in Moravia to avoid the Russian army that incited a pogrom against the Jewish residents of Horodenka: nine Jews were hanged in the main street. When his family returned to Horodenka after the war, Jakob stayed in Brno to finish his studies at a business school. After his graduation he left Brno for Teplitz in northern Bohemia to work as a traveling salesman.

Edelstein became a fierce member of the Poale Zion movement and an activist in the Social Democrat Party. In 1927 he left the Party and for two years was only active in the Přátelé přírody, a social democrat movement of nature friends.

From 1926 Edelstein was involved in the Hechalutz, a Zionist youth organization and in World War II a resistance movement; later he worked at their head office. In 1929, Edelstein joined the Histadrut, an organization of trade unions for and later in Israel.

Jakob Edelstein married in 1931 and left Teplitz with his bride Miriam for Prague to work for the Palästina-Amt (Palestine Office of the Zionist movement). Starting in 1933, he acted as head of that office; he remained in his position until the office was closed right before the outbreak of World War II.

In 1937 he was for several months very active for the Keren Hayesod (a fund raising organisation) in Jerusalem.

Before the war Edelstein and his family had the opportunity and the documents for immigration to Eretz Israel. They planned to get to Kibbutz Givat Haim, but Edelstein chose to stay in Czechoslovakia and with his community.

=== World War II ===
On 15 March 1939, Germany annexed what was left of Czechoslovakia and established the protectorate of Bohemia and Moravia. Edelstein called for the Zionist leaders to head the Jewish community, and became the liaison between the Jewish community and the SS to deal with Jewish emigration. For this purpose Edelstein travelled, with permission of the Gestapo, abroad to Bratislava, Vienna, Berlin, Trieste and Genoa between 1939 and 1941.

Edelstein and his substitute Otto Zucker visited England and the British Mandate for Palestine in 1938 to help facilitate the evacuation of Jewish refugees. During this period, his wife was ordered to stay in Czechoslovakia, thus forcing him to return home. In 1940, Edelstein went to Trieste in order to evacuate Czechoslovak Jews. In March 1941, he and his associate Richard Friedmann were commanded by the SS to instruct the chairmen of the Jewish Council in Amsterdam, Abraham Asscher and David Cohen, to establish an administrative apparatus between the counsel and the "Central Office for Jewish Emigration in Amsterdam" (the only one in Western Europe), like the Central Office in Prague.

On 18 October 1939, Edelstein, Friedmann and another thousand Jewish men were, due to the so-called Nisko-und-Lublin-Plan, deported from Ostrava to Nisko in the Lublin reservation, a concentration camp in the General Government. After the Nisko Plan was dissolved, for pragmatic reasons, Edelstein returned to Prague in November 1939.

On 4 December 1941, by order of the head of the "Central Office for Jewish Emigration in Prague" SS-Sturmbannführer (major) Hans Günther, Edelstein and his family were deported to Theresienstadt. They were among transport "Stab, č".

The camp commandant SS-Obersturmführer Siegfried Seidl designated him as the first Judenältester (Jewish Elder) of the Jewish Council of Elders in the ghetto.

Edelstein and his associates were determined to prevent further deportations to the East by organizing a self-sustaining, productive community that the Germans would find indispensable to their war effort." Jüdische Arbeit zur Rettung jüdischen Lebens" (Jewish work to save Jewish lives), was the idea behind Edelsteins policy.

In January 1943 Edelstein was replaced as Judenältester by Paul Eppstein and became his first substitute.

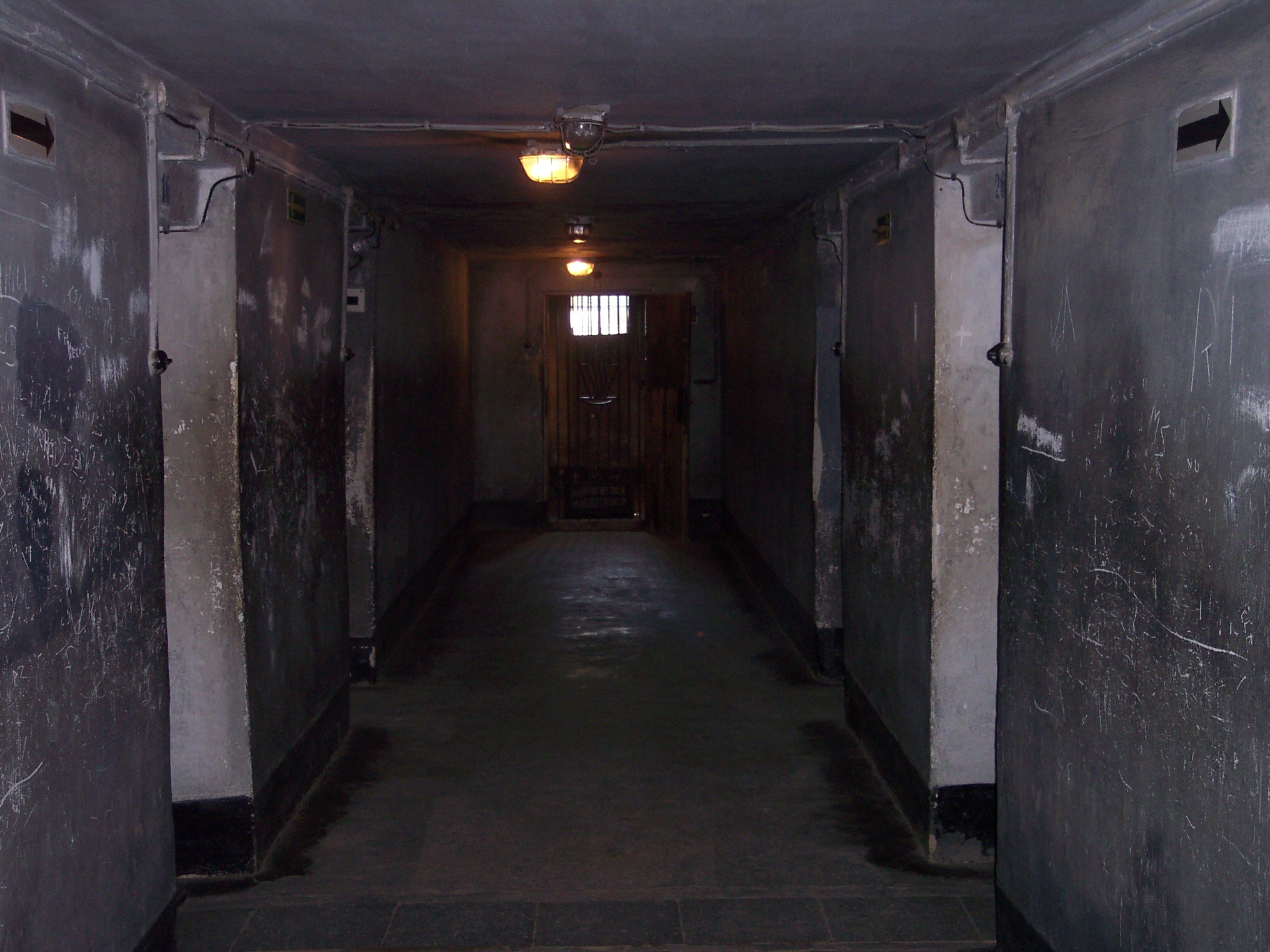
Death Block 11

At a count in the ghetto on 9 November 1943 a difference of 55 Jews between the registered and the actual number of inmates appeared. Edelstein was accused of aiding the escape of inmates and was arrested on November 11, 1943.

On 15 December 1943, Edelstein was deported to the Auschwitz I concentration camp, where he was kept isolated in Block 11 for half a year. He was deported on transport "Dr". His wife, his son, and his mother in law were sent to the Theresienstadt family camp at Auschwitz II-Birkenau, Biib. The family was reunited on 20 June 1944. Jakob Edelstein had to watch the murder of first his mother in law then his wife Miriam and his twelve-year-old son Ariel before he was shot to death in the crematorium of the gas chamber.

In June 1947, on the three-year yahrzeit of Yacov Edelstein's death in Auschwitz, Max Brod wrote: "And so a Jewish hero left this world, a man who up to the end did everything he possibly could and never gave up.

== Literature ==
- Israel Gutman: Enzyklopädie des Holocaust - Die Verfolgung und Ermordung der europäischen Juden, Piper Verlag, München/Zürich 1998, 3 Bände, ISBN 3-492-22700-7
- Hans Günther Adler: Theresienstadt: das Antlitz einer Zwangsgemeinschaft 1941-1945 Nachwort Jeremy Adler. Wallstein, Göttingen, 986 pages, 2005 ISBN 978-3-89244-694-1
- Bondy, Ruth. Elder of the Jews": Jakob Edelstein of Theresienstadt, translated from the Hebrew 1989, ISBN 0-8021-1007-X
