= Out of Many, One (film) =

2018 documentary film

- Directed by: John Hoffman; Nanfu Wang
- Distributed by: Netflix
- Release date: December 12, 2018
- Running time: 34 minutes
- Country: United States
- Language: English

Out of Many, One is a 2018 American short documentary film directed by John Hoffman and Nanfu Wang. The film takes a look at the process of American immigration from the perspectives of the immigrants waiting for approval.

The documentary was released on Netflix on December 12, 2018.
