= Zhou Tao (artist) =

Chinese artist (born 1976)

- Born: Zhou Tao (周滔); 1976 (age 49–50); Changsha, China
- Awards: 1st Han Nefkens Foundation BACC Award for Contemporary Art in Asia (2013); 1st Prize of the Jury of the Ministry, 61st International Short Film Festival Oberhausen (2015)

Zhou Tao (born 1976) is a Chinese artist who is based in Guangzhou. His mixed media exhibitions create urban documentaries of intimacy through the prolonged act of looking.

== Early life and education ==
Zhou was born in Changsha, China, in 1976. He received a BFA in oil painting from the Guangzhou Academy of Fine Arts in 2001 and an MFA in mixed-media studies in 2006.

== Work ==
Zhou's composites from various locations are experiences that present the here and now in different regions. His videos record interactions between people, things, and situations, touching on questions about the multiple trajectories of reality. Zhou has also worked in performance. Zhou's documentary works are in fact rehearsed and costumed assemblies of everyday activity.

After Reality (2013), images juxtapose his home base of Guangzhou and the highly manicured cityscapes of Paris.

Blue and Red (2014), the heavy-metal waste contaminating industrial zones in Shaoguan, China, are compared to a military coup riot in Bangkok.

1234 (2016),

Land of the Throat (2016), commissioned for the Guggenheim Museum, a construction and urban planning site in southern China is shown with research on Mars.

The worldly Cave (2018), Exhibited with Adrian Villar Rojas and presented at Centre Pompidou, Paris it is a reflection on the tensions and breaking points that exist between human production and nature.

== Exhibitions ==
=== Solo shows ===
- MIT List Visual Arts Center, Cambridge, Massachusetts (2009)
- Guangdong Times Museum, Guangzhou, China (2012)
- Hiroshima City Museum of Contemporary Art (2012)
- Kadist Art Foundation, Paris (2013)
- Museu d’art contemporani, Barcelona (2015).

=== Group shows ===
- Octomania (On drawing the number eight)
- Para Site, Hong Kong (2006)
- Guangzhou Station, Guangdong Museum of Art (2008)
- On/Off, China’s Young Artists in Concept and Practice, Ullens Center for Contemporary Art, Beijing (2012)
- Auckland Triennial (2013)
- Landscape: The Virtual, The Actual, The Possible?, Guangdong Times Museum (2014)
- Yerba Buena Center for the Arts, San Francisco (2014–15)
- Shanghai Biennial (2014)
- Asia Pacific Triennial, Brisbane (2015–16)
- Tales of Our Time, Solomon R. Guggenheim Museum, New York (2016–17)
