= Claude Lanzmann =

French documentary filmmaker (1925–2018)

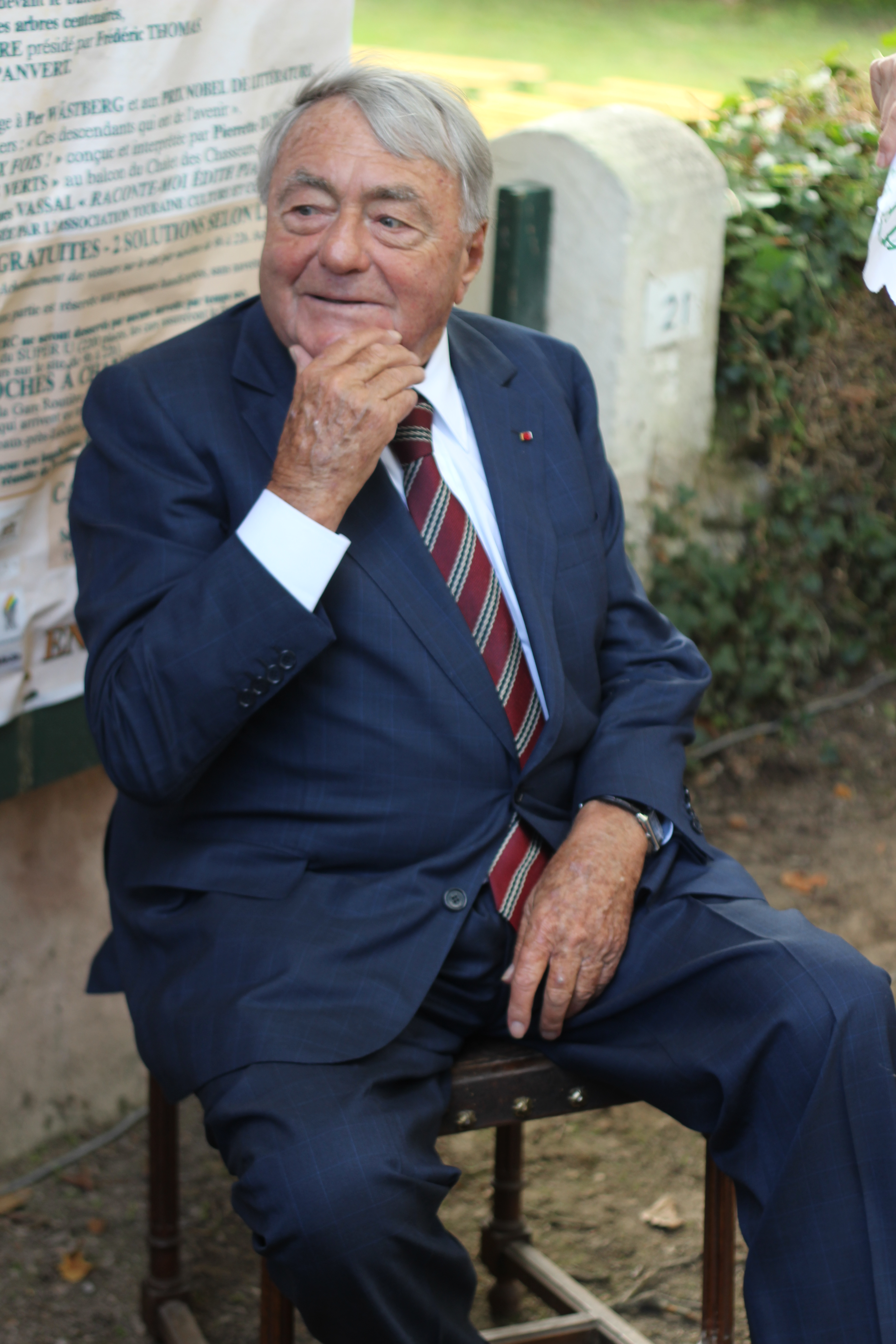
- Lanzmann in 2014
- Born: 27 November 1925; Bois-Colombes, France
- Died: 5 July 2018 (aged 92); Paris, France
- Occupation: Filmmaker
- Years active: 1970–2018
- Known for: Shoah (1985)
- Spouses: Judith Magre (m. 1963; div. 1971) Angelika Schrobsdorff (m. 1971, divorced) Dominique Petithory (m. 1995)
- Partner: Simone de Beauvoir (1952–1959)
- Children: 2

Claude Lanzmann (French: [lanzman]; 27 November 1925 – 5 July 2018) was a French filmmaker, best known for the Holocaust documentary film Shoah (1985), which consists of nine and a half hours of oral testimony from Holocaust survivors, witnesses, and perpetrators presented using contemporary, non-historical footage. He is also known for his 2017 documentary film Napalm, about a love affair he had with a North Korean nurse whilst visiting North Korea in 1958, several years after the Korean War.

In addition to filmmaking, Lanzmann had also been the chief editor of Les Temps Modernes, a French literary magazine.

== Early life ==
Lanzmann was born on 27 November 1925 in Bois-Colombes, Hauts-de-Seine département in France, the son of Paulette (née Grobermann) and Armand Lanzmann. His family was Jewish, and had immigrated to France from the Russian Empire. He was the brother of writer Jacques Lanzmann. Lanzmann attended the Lycée Blaise-Pascal in Clermont-Ferrand. While his family disguised their identity and went into hiding during World War II, he joined the French resistance at the age of 17, along with his father and brother, and fought in Auvergne. Lanzmann opposed the French war in Algeria and signed the 1960 antiwar petition Manifesto of the 121.

== Career ==
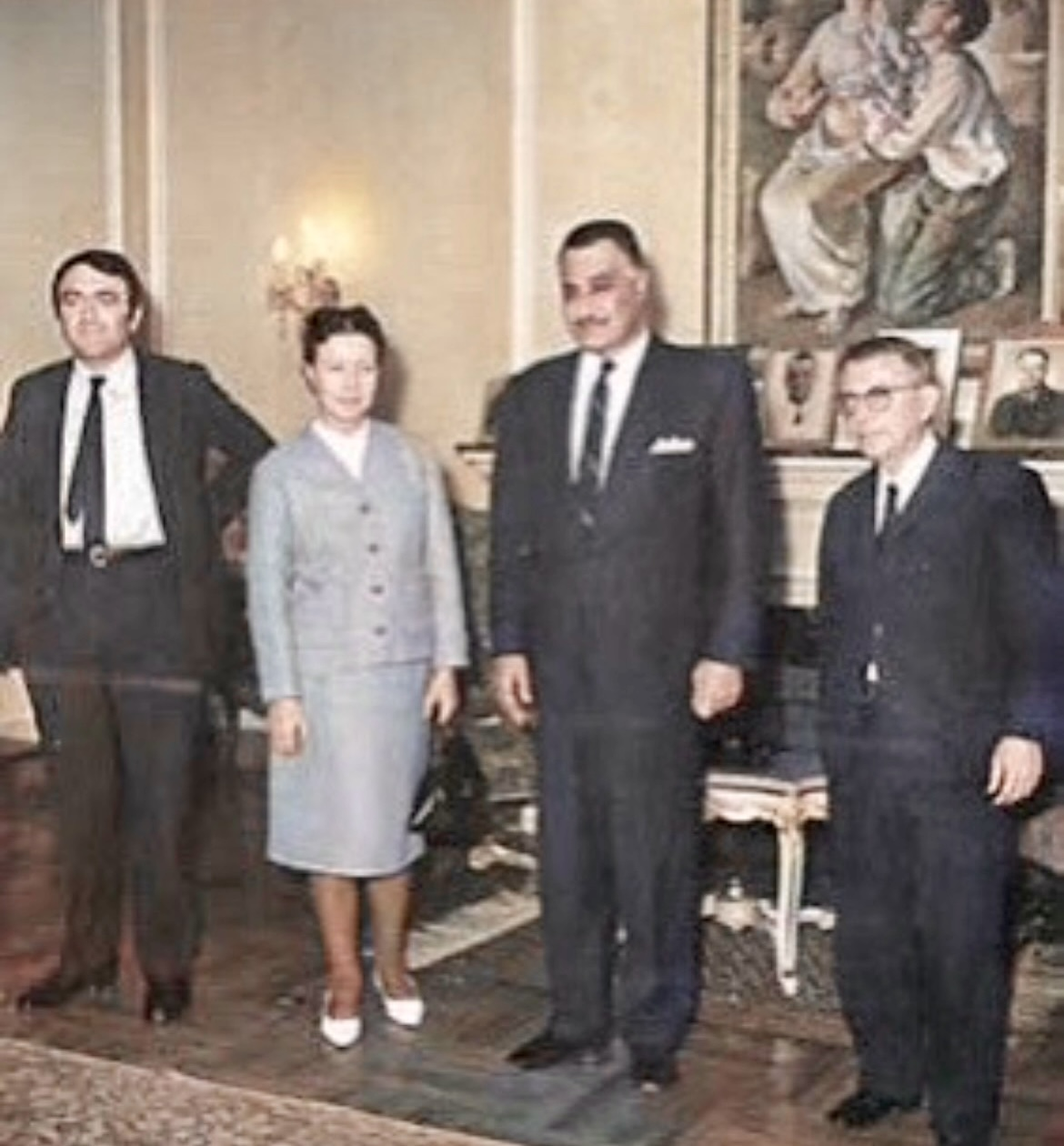
Egypt's President Gamal Abdel Nasser meeting Simone de Beauvoir, Jean-Paul Sartre and Lanzmann (first from left) in Cairo, 1967

Lanzmann was the chief editor of the journal Les Temps Modernes, founded by Jean-Paul Sartre and Simone de Beauvoir, and lecturer at the European Graduate School in Saas-Fee, Switzerland. In 2009 he published his memoirs under the title Le lièvre de Patagonie ("The Patagonian Hare").

=== Shoah ===
Lanzmann's most renowned work, Shoah (1985), is a nine-and-a-half-hour oral history of the Holocaust. Shoah is made without the use of any historical footage, and uses only first-person testimony from perpetrators and victims, and contemporary footage of Holocaust-related sites. Interviewees include the Polish resistance fighter Jan Karski and the American Holocaust historian Raul Hilberg. When the film was released, the director also published the complete text, including in English translation, with introductions by Lanzmann and Simone de Beauvoir.

Lanzmann disagreed, sometimes angrily, with attempts to understand Hitler and his motives, stating that the evil of Hitler cannot or should not be explained and that to do so is immoral and an obscenity.

Lanzmann also oftentimes pushed his subjects to extreme emotional limits to bring out the most authentic reactions for his audience. The interview with barber Abraham Bomba is an epitome of a Claude Lanzmann interview.

A compilation, Shoah: Unseen Interviews, was released in 2012, which included interviews filmed at the time of the original production but that never made it into the film.

On 4 July 2018, his last work, Les Quatre Soeurs (Shoah: Four Sisters) was released, featuring testimonials from four Holocaust survivors not included in his Shoah. Lanzmann died the following day.

== Personal life ==
Lanzmann was part of a leftist delegation which visited North Korea in 1958. Toward the end of the visit, he fell in love with a local nurse and had an illicit love affair, which was discovered by the authorities. Never forgetting the romance, he made a 2017 documentary entitled Napalm, as the nurse bore scars from American bombings during the Korean War.

From 1952 to 1959, he lived with Simone de Beauvoir. In 1963 he married French actress Judith Magre. He later married Angelika Schrobsdorff, a German-Jewish writer. He divorced a second time, and was the father of Angélique Lanzmann and Félix Lanzmann. Claude Lanzmann died on 5 July 2018 at his Paris home, after having been ill for several days. He was 92.

== Honours ==
- Resistance Medal with rosette
- Grand Cross of the National Order of Merit
- 2010 Welt-Literaturpreis
- 2011 Honorary Doctorate from the University of Lucerne
- 2011 Grand Officer of the Legion of Honor
- At the 63rd Berlin International Film Festival in February 2013, Lanzmann was awarded with the Honorary Golden Bear.

== Selected works ==
Filmography

- Pourquoi Israël (1973)
- Shoah (1985)
- Tsahal (1994)
- A Visitor from the Living (1997)
- Sobibor, 14 October 1943, 4 p.m. (2001)
- Lights and Shadows (2008)
- The Karski Report (2010)
- The Last of the Unjust (2013) about Benjamin Murmelstein, Elder of Theresienstadt
- Napalm (2017)
- Shoah: Four Sisters (2017)

As subject

- Claude Lanzmann: Spectres of the Shoah (2015) a documentary about Lanzmann, directed by Adam Benzine

Books

- Shoah: An Oral History of the Holocaust : The Complete Text of the Film. Pantheon Books, New York 1985, ISBN 978-0-394-55142-5
- The Patagonian Hare: A Memoir (translated by Frank Wynne). London: Atlantic Books, 2012, ISBN 978-1-84887-360-5; Farrar, Straus and Giroux, New York 2012, ISBN 978-0-374-23004-3
- La Tombe du divin plongeur. Gallimard, Paris 2012 ISBN 978-2-070-45677-2
- Le Dernier des injustes, Gallimard, 2015, 144 p. ISBN 978-2-07-010670-7
