= Spring Night, Summer Night =

1967 drama film by Joseph L. Anderson

- Film poster
- Directed by: Joseph L. Anderson
- Written by: Joseph L. Anderson; Franklin Miller; Doug Rapp
- Produced by: Joseph L. Anderson; Franklin Miller
- Starring: Larue Hall; Ted Heimerdinger; Marjorie Johnson; John Crawford; Hersha Parady
- Cinematography: Brian Blauser; David Prince; Art Stifel
- Edited by: Joseph L. Anderson; Franklin Miller
- Production company: Triskele
- Distributed by: Joseph Brenner Association (theatrical); Flicker Alley (home video)
- Release dates: May 28, 1967 (Pesaro International Film Festival); September 23, 1970 (Greensboro, North Carolina)
- Running time: 82 minutes
- Country: United States
- Language: English

Spring Night, Summer Night is a 1967 independent drama film directed, co-written, and co-produced by Joseph L. Anderson, a film professor from Ohio State University. Franklin Miller co-produced, as well as co-wrote alongside Doug Rapp. It stars Larue Hall, Ted Heimerdinger, Marjorie Johnson, John Crawford, and Hersha Parady. A sexploitation version was restructured from the film's contents in order to recoup losses, and distributed as Miss Jessica Is Pregnant.

The film has been likened to Italian neorealism. In 2021, director Nicolas Winding Refn commissioned an official restoration of the original film.

== Plot summary ==
In an Appalachian Ohio coal mining town, siblings Jessica and Carl have a complex relationship, exacerbated when she is impregnated by him. There are doubts about whether or not they are related, and thus negating incest. When he returns to town from Columbus, Ohio and discovers this, he contemplates between taking her away or abandoning her.

== Cast ==
- Larue Hall as Jessica Royer
- Ted Heimerdinger as Carl Royer
- Marjorie Johnson as Mae Royer (as Marj Johnson)
- John Crawford as Virgil Royer
- Hersha Parady as Donna (as Betty Ann Parady)
- Tracy Smith as Chris Royer
- Mary Cass as Rose
- David Ayres as Lou

== Release ==
The film premiered at the Pesaro International Film Festival in Italy on May 28, 1967. It was later released in the United States on September 23, 1970.

== Reception ==
Richard Brody of The New Yorker called the film a "tense, myth-drenched drama of liberation and retribution". Carson Lund of Slant Magazine stated that "Spring Night, Summer Night looks and sounds as delicate as the emotions it puts under a microscope". Lee Jutton of Film Inquiry lauded this for filming the Rust Belt in a "strangely beautiful", poetic way, "with an undercurrent of sadness".
