= Livia Rothkirchen =

Czech historian

- ליביה רוטקירכן
- Born: 1922; Veľká Sevljuš, Czechoslovakia
- Died: March 2013 (aged 90); Israel
- Occupation: Historian
- Notable work: The Destruction of Slovak Jewry (1961)

Livia Rothkirchen (Hebrew: ליביה רוטקירכן; 1922 – March 2013) was a Czechoslovak-born Israeli historian and archivist. She was the author of several books about the Holocaust, including The Destruction of Slovak Jewry (1961), the first authoritative description of the deportation and murder of the Jews of Slovakia.

== Early life and education ==
Rothkirchen was born to a Jewish family in Veľká Sevljuš in the province of Subcarpathian Rus, then part of Czechoslovakia (later part of Ukraine). She attended the gymnasium in Khust. In 1938 Nazi Germany annexed the Sudeten region of Czechoslovakia with the assent of major European states. Carpathian Ruthenia, including Veľká Sevljuš, was annexed by Hungary in March 1939. Germany then dismembered Czechoslovakia, replacing it with the Protectorate of Bohemia and Moravia and a nominally independent Slovak state, which collaborated with the Nazis. In all three areas, harsh regulations were imposed on Jewish citizens, most of whom were ultimately deported and killed. Rothkirchen and her family were deported to the Auschwitz concentration camp in May 1944 by the Hungarian authorities; her parents did not survive.

After the war, Rothkirchen and her three sisters moved to Prague, where she studied Russian and English language and literature at Charles University, obtaining her PhD in 1949 for a thesis on the English playwright and novelist J. B. Priestley, Modern England in the Light of J. B. Priestley's Plays.

== Research ==
After moving to Israel in 1956, Rothkirchen joined the staff of Yad Vashem, Israel's official memorial to victims of the Holocaust. She made a distinct contribution to documenting the Holocaust, specifically issues flowing from Germany's take-over of the democratic Republic of Czechoslovakia. Rothkirchen studied the impact of decisions of Europe's political leaders on general society, on Jewish communal leaders attempting to save their communities, and on Jews attempting to save themselves and their families from annihilation.

In or around 1968 Rothkirchen became the editor of Yad Vashem Studies (then known as Yad Vashem Studies on the European Jewish Catastrophe and Resistance), a position she held for 15 years, during which she edited volumes 7–15. She also authored and co-authored numerous articles for the journal, and wrote or edited several books. Gila Fatran wrote of Rothkirchen's first book, The Destruction of Slovak Jewry (1961), that "the trailblazing and dedicated work invested in it was reflected in its quality and exactitude". That work and her final book, The Jews of Bohemia and Moravia: Facing the Holocaust (2005), together "provide an overarching history of the Holocaust in the former Czechoslovakia", according to historian Michael L. Miller. The latter book received praise for being one of the only works on its subject available in English, but also some criticism for overemphasizing the idea of Czech tolerance and presenting a one-sided view of Czech-Jewish relations.

Rothkirchen was awarded the Max Nordau Prize for History in 1973. An issue of Yad Vashem Studies was dedicated to her memory after her death in Jerusalem in 2013.

== Selected works ==
- (1961). Hurban Yahadut Slovakyan. Jerusalem: Yad Vashem Press. OCLC 54158870
  - (1961). The Destruction of Slovak Jewry. Jerusalem: Yad Vashem Press. OCLC 916347531
- (1972) ed. Sanbar, Moshe. My Longest Year: In the Hungarian Labour Service and in the Nazi Camps. Jerusalem: Yad Vashem. OCLC 815444974
- (1976) with Israel Gutman, eds. The Catastrophe of European Jewry: Antecedents, History, Reflections. Selected Papers. Jerusalem: Yad Vashem. OCLC 3089486
- (1979). Deep-Rooted Yet Alien: Some Aspects of the History of the Jews in Subcarpathian Ruthenia. Fairview, NJ: Carpatho-Rusyn Research Center. OCLC 364803548
- (2005). The Jews of Bohemia and Moravia: Facing the Holocaust. Lincoln and Jerusalem: University of Nebraska Press and Yad Vashem. OCLC 218660281
