= Terezín Initiative =

Terezín Initiative (Czech: Terezínská iniciativa) is a voluntary organization for survivors of the Theresienstadt Ghetto and other Holocaust survivors from the Czech lands, as well as their descendants. It publishes a journal, Časopis Terezínská iniciativa. Terezín Initiative was one of the main collaborators in an effort to create a machine-readable database of the 150,000 victims of Theresienstadt. It also helped form the Terezín Ghetto Museum, and contributed money to the project. For many years until her death in 2018, Dagmar Lieblová was its president.
