= Theresienstadt Papers =

Collection of historical documents

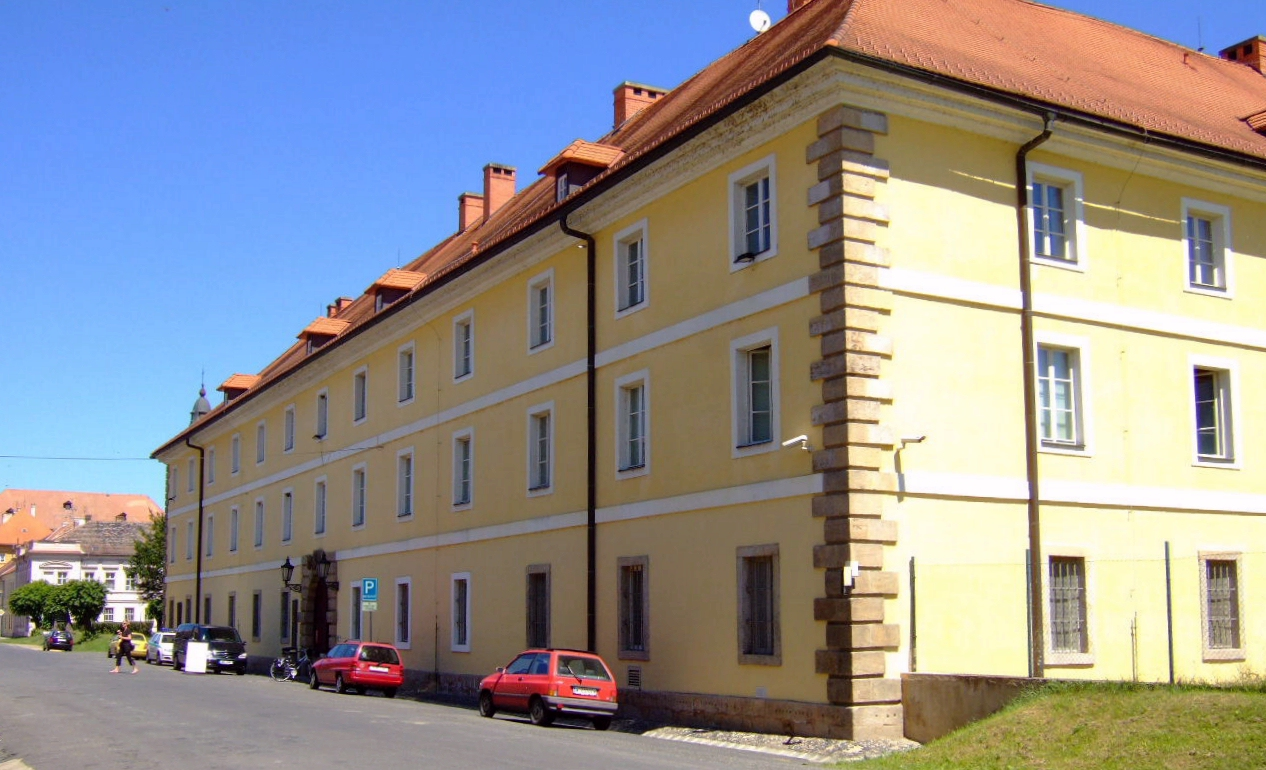
The "Magdeburg Barracks" was the seat of the Council of Elders and the Jewish self-government of the ghetto.

The Theresienstadt Papers (in German original Theresienstadt-Konvolut) are a collection of historical documents of the Jewish self-government of Theresienstadt concentration camp. These papers include an "A list" of so-called "prominents" interned in the camp and a "B-list" created by the Jewish Elders themselves. The Theresienstadt papers include two albums with biographies and many photographs, 64 watercolors and drawings from prisoners in Theresiendstadt, and the annual report of the Theresienstadt Central Library. The papers were preserved at the liberation of the camp in May 1945 by Theresienstadt librarian Käthe Starke-Goldschmidt and later loaned to the Altona Museum for Art and Cultural History in Hamburg by her son Pit Goldschmidt. The collection was opened for viewing by the public in 2002 at the Heine Haus branch of the Altona Museum.

== The prominents of Theresienstadt ==
Theresienstadt, also called Terezin, was a hybrid of ghetto and concentration camp. Although in practice the ghetto, run by the SS, served as a transit camp for Jews en route to extermination camps, it was also presented as a "model Jewish settlement" for propaganda purposes.

From 1942, the Nazis interned the Jews of Bohemia and Moravia, elderly Jews and persons of "special merit" in the Reich, and several thousand Jews from the Netherlands and Denmark. The camp became known as the destination for the Altentransporte ("elderly transports") of German Jews, older than 65. Many prominent artists from Czechoslovakia, Austria, and Germany were imprisoned at Theresienstadt, along with writers, scientists, jurists, diplomats, musicians, and scholars.

Among the western European Jews deported to the camp were 456 Jews from Denmark, sent to Theresienstadt in 1943, and a number of European Jewish children whom Danish organizations had tried to conceal in foster homes. The arrival of the Danes was significant, as their government requested access to the camp for the International Red Cross, so that they could view and evaluate conditions there. Historians believe the Nazis complied with the request to keep the Danes satisfied, as they were impressed by the production of Danish workers in factories. In addition, the tide of war was changing.

As part of the general preparations for the Red Cross visit, in the spring of 1944, the Gestapo screened the Jews of Theresienstadt, classifying them according to social prominence. The prominents of Theresienstadt were catalogued in two almost identical portfolios in blue cardboard cover and fasteners. Begun on 1 January 1944, these binders include not only resumes and many photographs, but identified the individual according to which category of prominence they fit, "A" or "B". The so-called prominents included cultural professionals, high-ranking military officers, politicians, scientists, aristocrats, bankers and industrialists and also, in some cases, their families.

Those with prominent status drew generally favorable treatment from the camp commandant, including homes with better living conditions, greater food rations, no obligation to work, and, for the "prominent category A", first transport protection. For the Red Cross visit, some 150 to 200 prominent individuals were assigned to single rooms that would be shared by only two people, so that a husband and wife could live by themselves. Several members of the Cultural Council – the "Jewish self-government of Theresienstadt" selected on demand of the Nazis – were included on the prominent list, due to the influence of Benjamin Murmelstein, then an Elder of Theresienstadt. Former prisoners suggested in statements that those who held positions of authority practiced nepotism, trying to protect individuals close to them, while struggling to avoid deportation and death in the closing days of the war.

== Watercolors and drawings ==
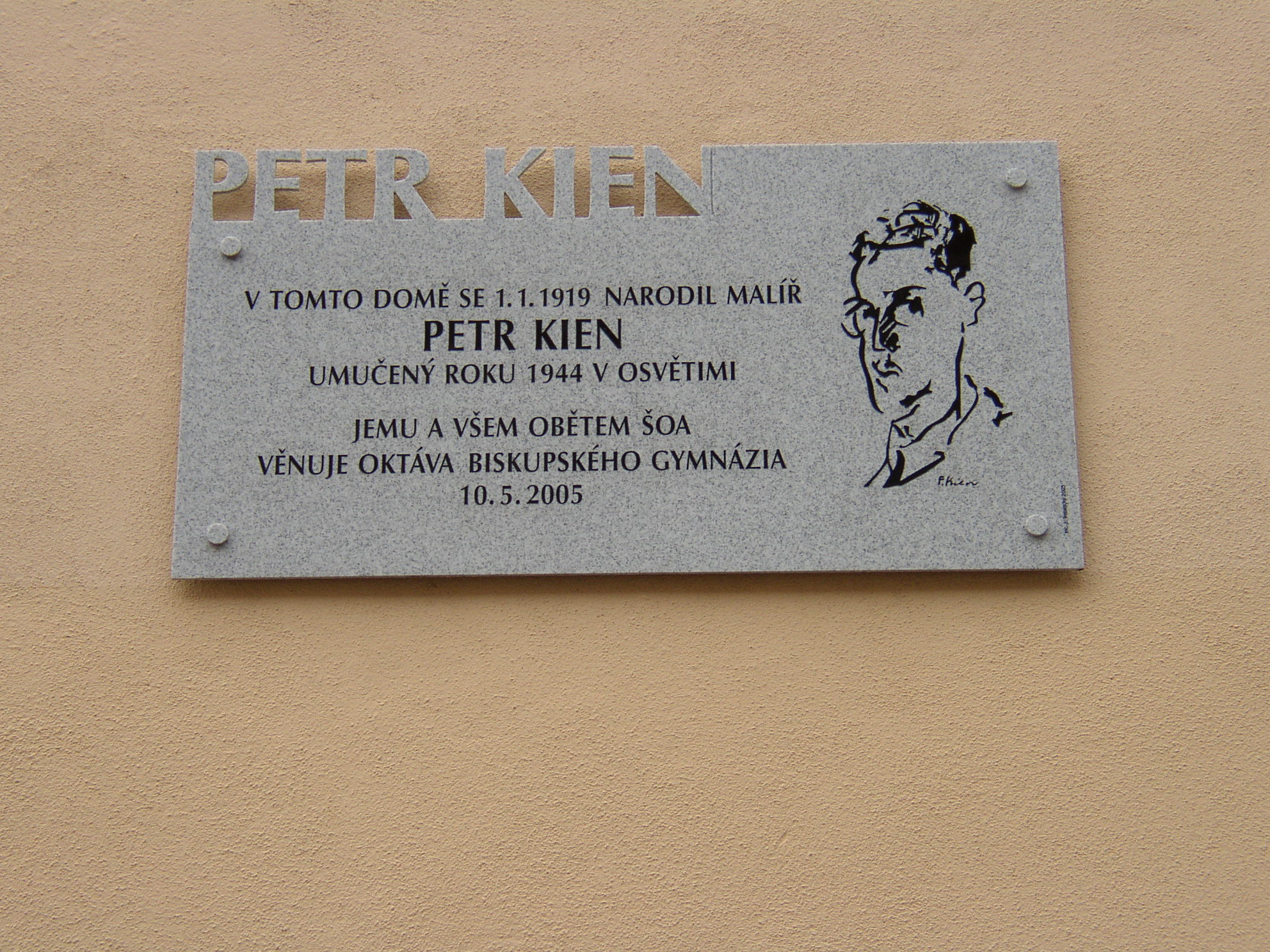
Peter Kien (1919–1944)

The 64 watercolors and drawings from the Theresienstadt camp were rescued by chief librarian Hugo Friedmann who had been gathering them secretly with the knowledge of library director Emil Utitz. He passed these works to Starke-Goldschmidt in September 1944, just before his deportation through Auschwitz to Dachau. The collection includes only a small part of the drawings and watercolors produced by artists within Theresienstadt to document daily life. (Many visual artists in Theresienstadt were employed in the design office of its Technical Department.) According to Starke-Goldschmidt, the artists lacked drawing paper, so she provided them with blank pages from the volumes within the library itself. The collection includes a self-portrait by Julie Wofthorn as well as images by Felix Bloch, Bedřich (Friedrich) Fritta, Leo Haas, Peter Kien and Otto Ungar. Some of these artists were eventually deported, with their families, to Auschwitz because the camp commandant became aware that they were smuggling images of "atrocity propaganda," as the Nazis termed it, to Switzerland.

== The Central Library ==
The Theresienstadt Central Library was one of several libraries in the combined ghetto and camp. The Central Library had been opened on the order of the camp commandant in November 1942 and remained active until the camp was dissolved, although the bulk of library staff was deported to Auschwitz in autumn of 1944 after the library had been beautified and shown to the Red Cross. During its years in operation, the library grew from a collection of 4,000 volumes to, at the end of the war, 180,000. Books included Hebraica, Judaica, fiction and classics alongside volumes of philosophy, history, and linguistic and scientific literature. The books had been confiscated from private individuals as well as from libraries, with 75% originating in Czechoslovakia and the rest coming from the German Reich. After the war, the holdings of the library were largely transferred to the Jewish Museum in Prague and, secondarily, to the Jerusalem National Library.

== List of prominents in the Theresienstadt Papers ==
Name	Dates	Arrival date	List A/B	Notes	Transport number
Achenbach, Paula von	1869–	11 August 1944	B	Born in Pringsheim. Widow of district administrator Heinrich von Achenbach.	
Aussenberg, Kurt	1910–	2 December 1941	B	Architect who worked as a civil engineer in the camp	
Baeck, Leo	1873–1956	1943	A	President of the Reich's Deputation of the German Jews. After his release in May 1945, president of the World Union for Progressive Judaism in London.	10764/1 – 87
Beck, Henriette	1869–1945	Apr. 1943	A	Opera singer and widow of theater director Otto Beck.	II/27 – 1207
Bernstein, Elsa	1866–1949	26 June 1942	A	Daughter of conductor Heinrich Porges, widow of author and critic Max Bernstein. Author under the pseudonym "Ernst Rosmer"	500–II/10
Biedermann, Samuel	1907–	20 January 1944	B	Entrepreneur from Amsterdam.	
Bleichröder, Elli von	1894–	27 July 1942	A	Granddaughter of the banker Gerson von Bleichröder.	1/31 – 2364
Bololanik, Rosa	1884–	3 September 1943	A	Wife of a Viennese cabdriver. Her son was a soldier for the German Wehrmacht who died in service in 1939 in Poland. She is believed to be the mother of Karoline Bololanik, an "A" lister who is not in the papers. (See list below.)	IV/14 – 932
Boschan, Julius	1896–1944	29 January 1943	B	Bank official from Vienna and decorated soldier of the first World War. Worked in the financial management of the warehouse. Was deported to Auschwitz on 28 October 1944.	
Busse, Paula	1876–nach 1945	11 January 1944	B	Originating from Hamburg, a widow of the first World War literary historian Carl Hermann Busse, who received the EK II	
Cohn, Alexander	1876–1951	28 January 1943	A	Doctor of law at the Kammergerichtsrat and decorated combat fighter. Author of legal works, an employee of a commentary on the Commercial Code together with Albert Mosse. Husband of Else Cohn, an "A" lister who is not in the papers. (See list below.)	10723 – I/87
Dalpas, Irma	1892–	21 March 1944	B	Widow of a contractor and local politician in Karwin. Liberated in 1945.	
Dauber, Lucian	1881–	28 August 1942	A	Lawyer. Husband of Jetti Dauber, an "A" lister who is not in the papers. (See list below.)	52–IV/8
Dessauer, Heinrich	1883–1944	29 January 1943	B	Doctor or law, Interpreters, head of the legal office of the Jewish Community in Vienna. On 12 October 1944, deported to Auschwitz.	
Eidlitz, Friedericke	1872–1944	21 June 1942	A	Widow of a businessman in Vienna. Her son Walther Eidlitz was held in a camp in India, where he had traveled as a student.	808 – IV/1
Feury, Ida von	1877–1957	4 June 1942	A	Awarded in World War I for allowing the family's castle to be used as a hospital. Widow of a noble front fighter. Their son Otto Freiherr von Feury was a well-known CSU politician and agricultural lobbyist in the postwar period. She was the sister of Karl and Rudolf von Hirsch	43 – II/1
Fiedler, Marie	1870–	10 January 1944	B	Widow of an Austrian front fighter.	
Flatow, Felix Gustav	1875–1945	26 February 1944	B	Flatow represented the German Reich in the first and in the second Olympic Games in gymnastics and in 1896 with the team Olympic champion on parallel bars and high bar.	
Frankau, Margit	1889–1944	6 January 1943	A	Deaconess from Graz. Combat nurse of World War I with war decorations.	55 – IV/14
Friediger, Max	1884–1947	29 January 1943	B	Royal Danish chief rabbi in Copenhagen. On 15 April 1945 with a convoy through Germany as part of the bailout of the white buses evacuated to Sweden.	
Friedländer, Johann	1882–1945	3 September 1943	A	Lieutenant of the Austrian army. Was on 16 October 1944 after the death of his wife Leona (see list below) deported to Birkenau to work assignments and shot in 1945 on the march from Auschwitz to Pless by the guards.	936–IV/14
Friedmann, Richard	1906–1944	28. Jan. 1942	B	Employee of the Jewish Community of Prague. In May 1944, deported to Birkenau, and shot under subterfuge of an escape attempt on 22 May 1944	
Fuhrmann, August	1865–1945	Jan. 1944	B	Widowed teacher who founded several vocal and gymnastics clubs.	
Gans, Heinrich	1874–	25 September 1942	A	Doctor of Law, superintendent in Vienna until 1936. Married to Olga Gans (see list below).	634–IV/141
Gerriets, Elsa	1886–	24 July 1942	A	Widow of a front-fighter.	466/VIII – 1
Gorter, Eugenie	1874–1953	23 July 1942	A	Nurse on the front line of World War I.	872–II/18
Grabower, Rolf	1883–1963	19 June 1942	A	First an employee of the Finance Ministry and then a judge at the Reichsfinanzhof. After 1945 he was honorary professor at the University of Erlangen and lecturer at the Federal Finance Academy .	341–II/7
Gradnauer, Georg	1866–1946	21 January 1944	B	a German newspaper editor and politician for the Social Democratic Party of Germany (SPD) and the first elected Minister-President of Saxony following the abolition of the Kingdom of Saxony.	
Grassmann, Gertrud	1899–	11 January 1944	B	Divorced from a soldier who was a frontline fighter in World War I and an Air Force officer in World War II.	
Grienwaldt, Elisabeth	1878–	15 May 1944	B	Widow of art photographer August Grienwaldt.	
Gruyters, Sofie	1886–	26 July 1942	A	Widow of entrepreneur Karl Gruyters in Krefeld.	476 VII/2
Henschel, Moritz	1879–1947	17 June 1943	B	Attorney and Notary, frontline fighters. Last Chairman of the National Association of Jews in Germany. Initiated the post office and later the leisure department of the ghetto.	
Heymann, Ernst	1892–	2 August 1944	B	Decorated flying officer of World War I. Married to a daughter of General August von Cramon	
Hirsch, Karl von	1871–1944	4 June 1942	A	Baron, Doctor of Philosophy, Brewery director of Bavaria. Brother of Rudolf von Hirsch.	42–II/I
Hirsch, Rudolf von	1875–1975	4 June 1942	B	Baron, Doctor of Philosophy, landowner at Schloss Planegg. Brother of Karl von Hirsch.	
Hirschbruch, Elise	1885–	20 November 1942	B	Wife of scientist Albert Hirschbruch.	
Hostovsky, Hermann Ferdinand	1877–1944	1 April 1943	A	Colonel of the Austrian army and frontline fighter. Husband of Klara Hostovský, see following list.	414 – IV/14f
Jacobson, Jacob	1884–1968	19 May 1943	A	Doctor of Philosophy, historian and frontline fighter. Head of the Complete Archive of the Jews in Germany. After the liberation in 1945, employed by the Leo Baeck Institute in London.	12663–I/94
Kessler, Johanna Elisabeth von	1874–	8 September 1944	B	Widow of a German officer.	
Klang, Heinrich	1875–1954	25 September 1942	A	Austrian legal scholar and judge. Presiding Judge of the Ghetto Court of Theresienstadt.	606–IV/11
Klein, Emil	1873–1950	23 July 1942	A	Austrian embassy physician in Berlin. University lecturer at the University of Jena. Married to Antonie Klein (see list below).	2451–I/32
Lederer, Eduard	1859–1944	6. Jul. 1942	A	Lawyer and Ministerial in the Ministry of Public Enlightenment. Author of numerous writings on Christianity and Judaism.	Aan 648
Ledwoch, Martha	1884–	15 October 1943	A	Widow of a police commissioner and later innkeeper in Strausberg. Liberated in 1945.	13933–I/102
Levin, Ursula	1912–nach 1944	10 March 1944	B	Secretary at the Turkish embassy in Berlin.	
Levit, Johann	1884–	20 June 1942	B	Surgeon and associate professor at Prague University Hospital.	
Loewenstein, Karl	1887–1976	17 May 1942	A	German naval officer of World War I in the vicinity of the crown prince. Banker in Berlin. Deported by the Gestapo to the Minsk ghetto in November 1941 due to his membership in the Confessing Church. In May 1942, the intervention of Commissioner General Wilhelm Kube resulted in his relocation to Theresienstadt. There in September 1942 he became the security chief of the ghetto and thus the second highest man in the Jewish Self-Government.	EZ 50
Loewy, Maximilian	1875–1948	7 May 1942	B	Professor of Neurology and Psychiatry in Marienbad, Prague and Cairo.	
Meissner, Alfred	1871–1950	1942	A	Czech politician and justice minister who authored numerous publications. Married to Rosa Meissner (see list below).	V 280
Meyer, Léon	1868–1948	12 July 1944	B	French trade minister and mayor of Le Havre. His family was not listed as prominent.	
Meyer, Owe	1885–	6 October 1943	B	Danish entrepreneur, including as Director of Bing & Grøndahl.	
Meyerhoff, Marianne	1912–1944	1 July 1943	A	Chemistry student. Deported to Auschwitz on 28 October 1944.	13766–I/99
Moresco, Emanuel	1869–1945	6 September 1944	B	Dutch diplomat and envoy to the League of Nations. He died after the liberation on 24 June 1945 in Eindhoven.	
Moser, Eugenie	1869–	11 September 1942	A	Initiated a basket factory in Vienna. Widow of the discoverer of scarlet fever serum, Paul Moser.	388–IV/10
Mosse, Martha	1884–1977	17 June 1943	A	First German police teacher for the Berlin Police Headquarters. She was the eldest daughter of Albert Mosse.	328–IV/10
Murmelstein, Benjamin	1905–1989	30 January 1943	B	Austrian rabbi. Succeeded Paul Eppstein as the Elder of the Thereseinstadt Judenrat.	
Neuberger, Leon	1880–1944	10 October 1942	A	Austrian professional officer and highly decorated frontline fighter. In Theresienstadt, Director of Investigation and Security Service.	1292–IV/13
Neumann, Richard	1878–1955	5 January 1945	B	German lawyer. Prosecutor during the Weimar Republic and after Senate President of the Federal Court of Justice.	
Ottenheimer, Paul	1873–1951	18 February 1945	B	Court kapellmeister and composer from Darmstadt.	
Panofsky, Erich Otto Georg	1894–1944	19 April 1943	A	Banker in Berlin; disabled veteran frontline fighter. On 28 Oktober 1944, deported to Auschwitz.	12385–I/91
Perlsee, Franz	1909–	9 April 1943	B	Seminar director and director of textile trade school.	
Philippson, Alfred	1864–1953	16 June 1942	A	Geographer and university teacher. Gained the status of prominent due to the appeal of Sven Hedins to Hitler.	544–III/1
Pick, Emil	1865–		A	Engineering and chemistry entrepreneur, honorary citizen of Tschaslau.	X 493
Pick, Hans	1884–nach 1950	20 November 1942	A	Doctor of Philosophy, Chemist and gas expert. Head of the disinfection system in the Ghetto.	Cc 194
Ploennies, Maria von	1877–	8 December 1944	B	Widow of an "Aryan" frontfighter.	
Pollak-Parille, Flora	1873–	2 August 1944	A	Widow from Amsterdam. Son was influential in the Amsterdam Judenrat.	
Prager, Stephan Friedrich	1875–1969	23 July 1942	A	Doctor of philosophy, Architect, Engineering expert, German officer in World War I.	679–VII/1
Praska, Ida	1899–	15 September 1943	B	Widow of an "Aryan" Director of the Hermann Göring Werke in Linz.	
Presinger, Paula	1884–	11 January 1944	B	Widow of an "Aryan" lawyer.	
Rauchenberg, Stefanie	1901–	25 April 1944	B	German former agent.	
Salinger, Julie	1873–	17 June 1942	A	Opera singer in Hamburg. Received Order of the Red Eagle award as a nurse in World War I.	1896–1/26
Schlitz, Else Gräfin von	1882–	7 April 1944	B	Widow of manor owner and captain Rudolf Graf von Schlitz.	
Schneidhuber, Ida Franziska	1892–	30 July 1942	A	Widow of former Nazi politician, SA leader and police chief of Munich August Schneidhuber.	II/20–968
Schultz, Clara	1862–	5 October 1943	B	Widow of a multiple award-winning Danish fleet commander.	
Schwarz, Aaron	1897–	7 April 1944	B	Dutch factory director and chemist.	
Seyssel d'Aix, Gräfin Gertrud	1877–1965	4 August 1942	A	Widow of a German officer of the First World War.	1058–II/22
Skutsch, Felix	1861–1951	18 March 1942	A	Doctor of Medicine, university professor and gynecologist.	11552–I/90
Sölver-Schou, Ebba	1886–	14 October 1943	B	Widow of the General Secretary of the Central Association of German Handiwork.	
Sommer, Emil Samuel	1869–1947	12 September 1942	A	Award-winning Austrian officer.	690–IV/10
Stahn, Alice	1884–	10 January 1944	B	Widow of a German officer of World War I.	
Stargardt, Otto	1874–	2 July 1942	A	Doctor of Law, Senate member of the Reich Supply Court, member of the Evangelical Provincial Synod.	798–I/14
Stein, Artur	1871–1950	6 July 1942	B	Doctor, Austrian-Czech historian and university professor in Prague.	
Stiassnie, Rudolf	1885–	3 September 1943	A	German businessman whose two sons were killed in World War II.	940–IV/14 i
Stoehr, Georg	1871–	1942 29. Juli; 1942	A	Doctor of Medicine, Military and Government, several times awarded in World War I.	464–IV/14i
Taussig, Leo	1884–	24 December 1942	B	Doctor of Medicine, Associate Professor of Psychology and Neurology, award-winning officer in World War I.	
Toepfer, Jenny	1875–	30 June 1943	A	Stepmother of an "Aryan" soldier who participated with distinction in World War II.	13541–I/97
Utitz, Emil	1883–1956	30 July 1942	A	Doctor, German-speaking philosopher, psychologist and art theorist. University professor.	AAv-268
Wadenfels, Gabriele von	1869–	Jul. 1942	A	Widow of an officer of World War I, who herself received high awards for service in the Kriegshilfsdienst (War Service Auxiliary)	842–II/17
Weissberger, Otto	1864–1944	26 June 1942	B	President of the West Bohemian Industrialists.	
Werner, Richard	1875–1945	28 January 1942	B	Doctor of medicine, Austrian-Czech university professor of medicine, acquired high honors as a medical officer in World War I	
Winterstein, Paul	1876–1945	10 October 1942	B	Austrian officer, Colonel in the general staff, acquired high awards in World War I	
Wolf, Louis Simon	1873–	20 January 1944	B	Dutch jeweler, member of the Diamond Exchange in Amsterdam.	
Wolfeus, Praag Salomon	1876–	6 September 1944	B	Deputy Chairman of the Dutch Red Cross.	

== Prominents of List A who are not included in the Theresienstadt Papers ==
Name	Dates	Arrival date	Notes	Transport number
Bloch, Sigmund	1865–1944	194?	Doctor of Medicine, general practitioner in Prague.	
Bololanik, Karoline	1918–	1943	Believed to be the daughter of Rosa Bololanik (see previous list).	IV/14 – 933
Cierer, Alfred	1896–1944	18 December 1943	Merchant, adviser to the Greek Ministry of Economic Affairs in Athens, confidant of papal charities for Greece. Imprisoned with his family, following.	EZ 240
Cierer, Elsa	1906–	18 December 1943	Wife of Alfred Cierer.	EZ 241
Cierer, Ahni	1931–1944	18 December 1943	Daughter of Alfred and Elsa Cierer.	EZ 242
Cierer, Katharine	1927–	18 December 1943	Daughter of Alfred and Elsa Cierer.	EZ 243
Cierer, Kurt	1925–	18 December 1943	Son of Alfred and Elsa Cierer.	EZ 244
Cohn, Else	1885–	28 January 1943	Wife of Alexander Cohn (see previous list).	10723 – I/87
Dauber, Jetti	1889–	1942 (?)	Wife of Lucian Dauber (see previous list).	433–IV/8
Eppstein, Paul	1902–1944	End Jan. 1943	Doctor, Sociology and known lobbyist of German Jewry at the Reich level. He was the second Elder of the Judenrat. He was shot on 28 September 1944.	
Eppstein, Hedwig	1903–1944	1943	Doctor, wife of Paul Eppstein, above. Deported to Auschwitz in October 1944, where she died.	
Friedländer, Leona	1872–1944	1943	Wife of Johann Friedländer (see previous list). Her husband voluntarily accompanied her to the camp. She died in 1944 in Theresienstadt.	973 – IV/14i
Friedmann, Desider	1880–1944		President of the Jewish Community Vienna. He was head of the bank of the ghetto and in October 1944 was deported to Auschwitz.	986 – IV/11
Friedmann, Ella	1887–		Wife of Desider Friedmann, above.	987–IV/11
Gans, Olga	1886–	1942	Wife of Heinrich Gans (see previous list).	635–IV/11
Grün, Maurice	1890–		Austrian Zionist und head of the Palestinian Office in Vienna.	IV/14.d/308
Gutmann, Friedrich	1886–1944		Banker and son of the founder of the Dresdner Bank, Eugen Gutmann. He was a wealthy art collector who had converted to Christianity. He was forced to "sell" his collection before being sent to Theresienstadt, where he was beaten to death.	296–XIX/1
Gutmann, Louise	1892–1944		Wife of Friedrich Gutmann, above. After her husband's death, she was deported to Auschwitz, where she died.	297–XXIV/1
Hänisch, Victor	1865–		Baron. Highly decorated Austrian engineer and frontline fighter.	IV – 14/350/351
Hostovsky, Klara	1884–1944	1 April 1943	Wife of Hermann Ferdinand Hostovsky (see previous list).	415 – IV/14f
Kahn, Franz	1895–1944	Jan. 1943	Doctor of Law, Functionary of the World Jewish Congress. In October 1944, deported to Auschwitz.	EZ 160
Kahn, Olga	1895–	Jan. 1943	Wife of Franz Kahn, above.	EZ 179
Klein, Antonie	1870–1945		Wife of Emil Klein.	2452–I/32
Liebeschütz, Jeschiel	1856–1943		Doctor, police doctor and awarded participant in World War I.	12666 – I/94
Löwenstein, Leo	1879–1943		Doctor, owner of a research laboratory and awarded participant in World War I.	13757 – I/99
Meissner, Rosa	1887–		Wife of Alfred Meissner.	V 281
Panofsky, Liselotte	1921–2013		Daughter of Erich Panofsky.	12387–I/91
Philippson, Dora	1896–		Daughter of Alfred Philippson	553–III/1
Philippson, Margarete	1882–		Wife of Alfred Philippson	552–III/1
Popiel, Simon	1865–1945		Doctor of Medicine, Surgeon General.	480–IV/10
Skutusch, Helene	1875–		Wife of Felix Skutsch.	11551–I/90
Sommer, Anna	1887–		Wife of Emil Sommer.	690–IV/10
Stargardt, Edith	1880–		Wife of Otto Stargardt.	799–I/14
Utitz, Ottilie	1890–		Wife of Emil Utitz	AAv–267
Wongtschowski, Bianca	1876–1944		Wife of general staff physician Dr. Adolf Wongtschowski.	8207–I/71

== Literature ==
- Elsa Bernstein: Das Leben als Drama. Erinnerungen an Theresienstadt, Edition Ebersbach, Dortmund 1999 (Hrsg. Rita Bake Birgit Kiupel), ISBN 978-3931782542.
- Axel Feuß: Das Theresienstadt-Konvolut. Altonaer Museum in Hamburg, Dölling und Galitz Verlag, Hamburg/München 2002, ISBN 3-935549-22-9.
- Ralph Oppenhejm: An der Grenze des Lebens – ein Theresienstädter Tagebuch. Kopenhagen 1945, Hamburg 1961.
- Käthe Starke: Der Führer schenkt den Juden eine Stadt. Haude & Spenersche Verlagsbuchhandlung, Berlin 1975, ISBN 3-7759-0174-4.
- Ruth Bondy: Prominent auf Widerruf, in: Miroslav Karny, Raimund Kemper, Margita Karna (Hrsg.): Theresienstädter Studien und Dokumente, Prag 1995, S. 136–154.
