= Ernst Pringsheim =

Ernst Pringsheim may refer to:

- Ernst Pringsheim Sr. (1859–1917), German physicist
- Ernst Pringsheim Jr. or Ernst Georg Pringsheim (1881–1970), German scientist, botanist, bacteriologist

== See also ==
- Pringsheim
