= Hermann Boeschenstein (Germanist) =

Swiss-Canadian professor (1900–1982)

- Boeschenstein in 1956, photographed by Ken Bell
- Born: May 1, 1900; Stein am Rhein, Switzerland
- Died: September 21, 1982 (aged 82); Toronto, Canada

Academic background
- Education: University of Rostock
- Thesis: Die Aesthetik des J. P. de Crousaz (1924)
- Doctoral advisor: Emil Utitz

Academic work
- Discipline: Germanist
- Institutions: University of Toronto
- Doctoral students: Robert L. Kahn
- Main interests: German literature

Hermann Boeschenstein (May 1, 1900 – September 21, 1982) was a Swiss-Canadian scholar of German studies and author of several novels. After his youth in Stein am Rhein and Schaffhausen, he studied in Germany and obtained a PhD in philosophy in 1926. He travelled in Europe and Canada, settling in Toronto in 1928, where he taught German and German literature at the University of Toronto from 1930 to 1968. From 1943 to 1946, he took a leave of absence to serve as Director for Canada of the War Prisoner's Aid of the YMCA, travelling to the Canadian internment camps for German prisoners of war and overseeing work to help them re-integrate into postwar society. In 1956, Boeschenstein became the Head of the German department at Toronto.

Besides his scholarly work that included eleven monographs about German culture and literature, he wrote short stories and novels with some autobiographic elements, many of them concerned with migration. Two novels were published during his lifetime, the 1921 expressionist Die Mutter und der neutrale Sohn and the 1977 Im Roten Ochsen: Geschichte einer Heimkehr about a Swiss emigrant couple's return home. Two further novels about migration and a monograph about German literature were published posthumously from Boeschenstein's manuscripts.

The Canadian Association of University Teachers of German awards a Hermann Boeschenstein medal in his memory.

== Early life ==
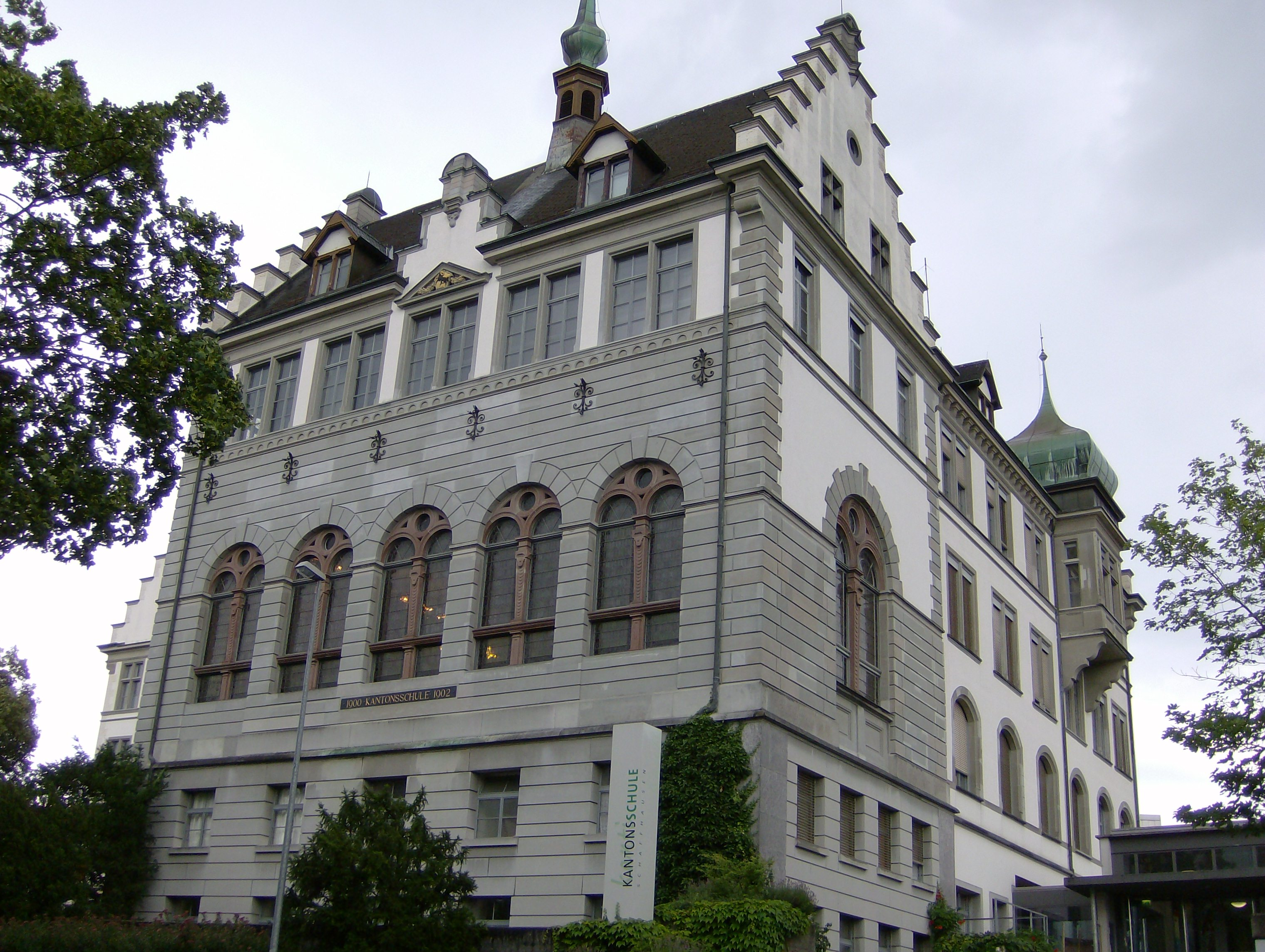
Kantonsschule Schaffhausen, the Gymnasium in Schaffhausen.

Boeschenstein was born in the Swiss town of Stein am Rhein, the son of Hermann Böschenstein, a merchant, and his wife Katharina, née Krüsi. After elementary school and Realschule in Stein, he moved to Schaffhausen to attend the Gymnasium. In 1917, he became a member of the local fraternity Scaphusia Schaffhausen. He graduated with the Maturität in 1919. He went to Zürich and then to Munich, where he enrolled in an acting school. After volunteering as a medical orderly for the Polish Army in 1920, Boeschenstein studied German literature, philosophy, archaeology, and history at the universities of Berlin, Kiel, Königsberg, and finally the University of Rostock, where he obtained a PhD in 1924, with a thesis on the aesthetics of Swiss philosopher Jean-Pierre de Crousaz, supervised by Emil Utitz. After his military service in the Swiss infantry, he travelled around Europe, spending time in Admont, Austria as well as Naples and Paris. From Paris, he travelled to Canada, where he worked various odd jobs including lumberman and janitor. During this 1926–1928 "vagabond" period, he also worked as a doorman in Victoria, British Columbia. Some of his experiences from this time later featured in his autobiographic collection of short stories and anecdotes Unter Schweizern in Kanada (Among Swiss in Canada). He returned to Switzerland in 1928 to marry Elisabeth Schoch (1901–1976); they then moved to Toronto together in August 1928. In Toronto, Boeschenstein at first made a living with various odd jobs, for example laying floor at the Royal York Hotel before finding steady employment in the spring of 1930 as a laboratory assistant at the University of Toronto's Banting Institute, where he had to take care of the animals. In the fall of 1930, he additionally started teaching technical German at the Banting Institute and later at the Chemistry department.

== Academic career ==
In Toronto, Boeschenstein also started to study philosophy with George Sidney Brett. A chance encounter with George H. Needler from the German department led to his appointment as Lecturer in German conversation at the University of Toronto in 1932, starting his academic career. In 1943, he took a leave of absence and worked for the YMCA's War Prisoner's Aid until 1947. After his return, he was promoted to full professor and eventually became Head of Department in 1956, succeeding Barker Fairley. His retirement is given in various sources as happening in 1967, 1968, or 1972. In the 1970s, Boeschenstein also had appointments at McGill University and the University of Waterloo that ended with his final retirement in 1976.

== Work with prisoners of war ==
When World War II started in 1939, Boeschenstein was briefly arrested in his Toronto home on suspicion of being German and hence an enemy of Canada, but released on the same day after explaining he came from neutral Switzerland. In 1943, Boeschenstein was approached by Jerome Davis to join the Canadian committee of the War Prisoner's Aid of the YMCA, and he started full time work on this in May 1943 after he was granted leave from teaching and was responsible for all POW related activities from July 1943. He travelled to the 26 internment camps and work detachments spread out all over Canada, helping prisoners by providing literature and with issues like contacting family or dealing with officials. The YMCA supplied sporting equipment, musical instruments, books and other items to the prisoners. The prisoners put up theatrical and musical performances that Boeschenstein attended. An important aim of the program was to help reintegrate the prisoners into post-war society. He kept in contact with dozens of POWs after the war, and was the guest of honour at a 1980 reunion.

== Scholarly work ==
A 1979 bibliography of Boeschenstein's works lists eleven scholarly books in German and English as well as 37 articles. Boeschenstein's major books are two volumes on Deutsche Gefühlskultur (German emotional culture) from 1954 and 1966. He also wrote books about Hermann Stehr, Jeremias Gotthelf and Gottfried Keller. During his time working with prisoners of war, he read a large amount of wartime German novels and produced the report The German Novel, 1939–1944. Later in life, he wrote a book on 19th-century German literature in which Paul Heyse's works are described as "dangerously perfect in style and structure." Boeschenstein edited a volume of German-Canadian humour that included the Joe Klotzkopp letters of John Adam Rittinger. He also translated two scholarly monographs by Barker Fairley from English into German, one about Goethe and one about Wilhelm Raabe.

After Boeschenstein's death, Rodney Symington edited two volumes of his essays in 1986 and published Boeschenstein's A History of Modern German Literature in 1990.

== Fiction ==
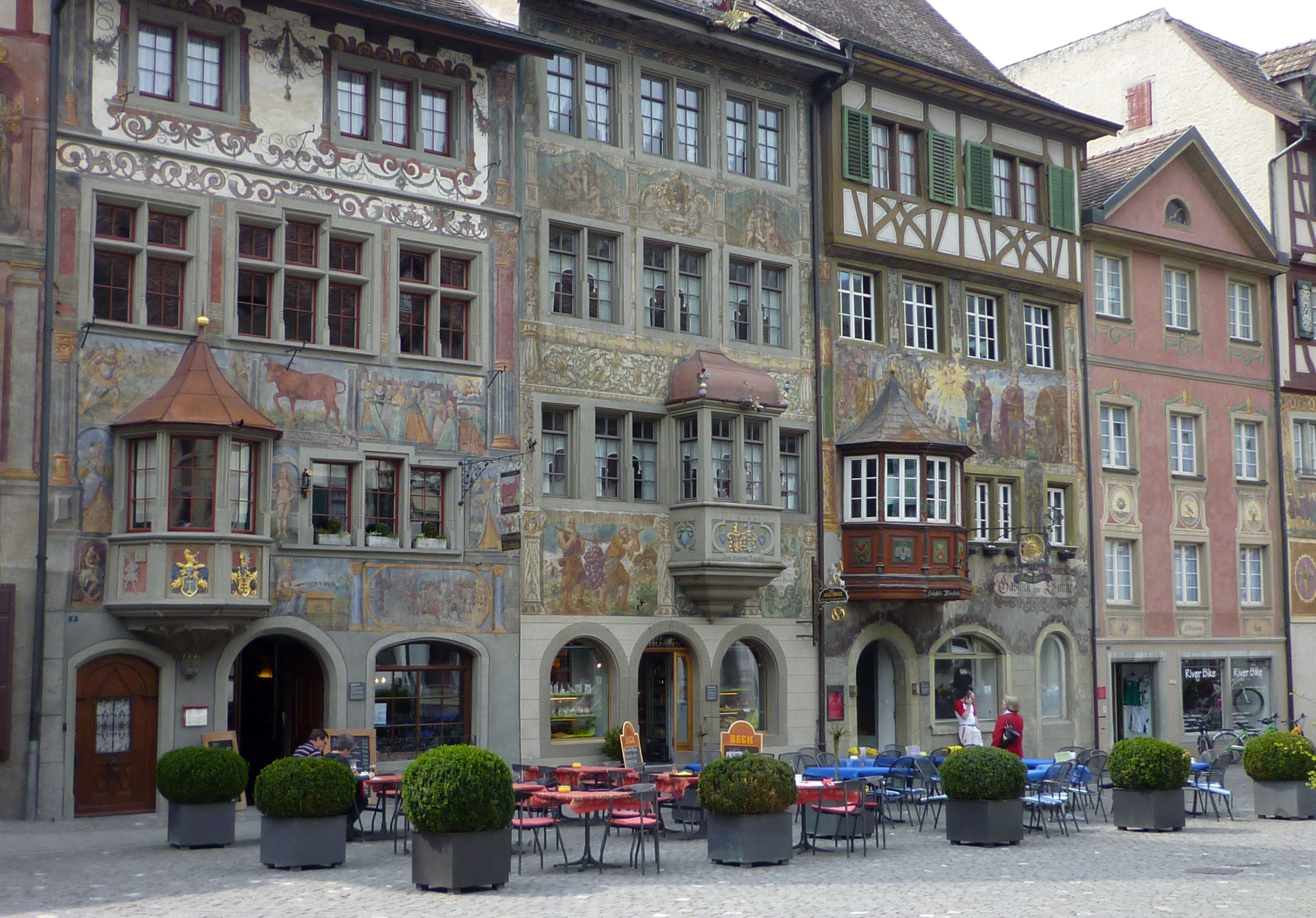
Historic houses in Stein am Rhein. Zum Roten Ochsen is on the left.

Boeschenstein published two novels during his lifetime, Die Mutter und der neutrale Sohn (The Mother and the Neutral Son) in 1921 and Im Roten Ochsen: Geschichte einer Heimkehr (In the Red Oxen: Story of a Return Home) in 1977. In both novels, the female protagonist is based on his wife Elisabeth. The 1921 novel, a parody of an expressionist novel, contains stylistic experiments and dadaist prose. The author later called the novel a Jugendsünde, a youthful mistake.

His second novel, written after his retirement, is about an emigrant couple's return to his Swiss home town, Stein am Rhein, where the titular Zum Roten Ochsen is a real inn. In the novel, the main character, a proxy for Boeschenstein, writes a novel about a pre-World War I airplane and pilot. This novel in the novel, called Leichter-als-die-Luft (Lighter-than-air) has been described as the best part of the book, with the main character described as "rather colorless".

Between these two novels, Boeschenstein published a collection of stories and anecdotes Unter Schweizern in Kanada, with autobiographical content from the years 1926 to about 1947. Boeschenstein also translated from English and French. His collection Kanadische Lyrik of poetry in his own translation is one of the earliest anthologies of Canadian poetry to be published outside of Canada.

In the 1980s, Boeschenstein was also working on several dramas as well as a humorous novel about the lack of women's suffrage in Switzerland. After his death, two more novels concerned with migration were published: Traugott Ochsner (1992) and Der Rucksackroman (2004).

== Students ==
One of Boeschenstein's PhD students was Robert Ludwig Kahn (1950, Kotzebue, His Social and Political Attitudes. The Dilemma of a Popular Dramatist in Times of Social Change), who later became Chairman of the Department of Germanics at Rice University. After Kahn's 1970 suicide, Boeschenstein contributed an article about his own advisor Emil Utitz to the memorial volume. Other students include Klaus Bongart (1968/69, The Political and Social Problems in the Prose Works of Heinrich Zschokke), Margaret Mian (1970/71, Hermann Broch's Views on Art, Literature and Language), Joseph L. Vida, (1970/71, The Hungarian Image in Nineteenth Century German Literature), and Kari Grimstad (1972/73, Karl Kraus as a Literary Critic).

== Personal life ==
Boeschenstein met his future wife Elisabeth (called Lili) Schoch during his time in Schaffhausen. They moved to Toronto after their 1928 marriage and had four children: Frank (born in 1929), Gertrude, Tom, and Bill. On summer weekends, they were often guests of George Needler's family on his Lake of Bays property, where Boeschenstein relaxed by cutting grass or painting landscapes. The family later bought Needler's Toronto house, which was close to the university. After his wife's 1976 death, Boeschenstein decided to spend the rest of his life writing fiction. He died of lung cancer in Toronto on September 21, 1982.

== Awards and legacy ==
Boeschenstein received an honorary LL.D. from Queen's University at Kingston in 1968 as well as many other awards and prizes. He was a Member of the Royal Society of Canada.

The Canadian Association of University Teachers of German occasionally awards the Hermann Boeschenstein medal to "a person – normally a Germanist at a Canadian university – who has made exceptional contributions, in the humanitarian spirit of Hermann Boeschenstein, to the welfare of our Association and to the advancement of our discipline in Canada."
