= The Long Intermission =

1927 film directed by Carl Froelich

- Directed by: Carl Froelich
- Written by: Oscar Blumenthal (play); Max Bernstein (play); Fred Hildenbrand; Walter Supper
- Produced by: Wilhelm von Kaufmann; Carl Froelich; Henny Porten
- Starring: Henny Porten; Wolfgang von Schwindt; Livio Pavanelli
- Cinematography: Axel Graatkjær
- Production company: Henny Porten-Froelich-Produktion
- Distributed by: Parufamet
- Release date: 9 November 1927
- Country: Germany
- Languages: Silent; German intertitles

The Long Intermission (German: Die große Pause) is a 1927 German silent drama film directed by Carl Froelich and starring Henny Porten, Wolfgang von Schwindt and Livio Pavanelli. It is based upon the play written by Oscar Blumenthal and Max Bernstein.

It was shot at the Tempelhof Studios in Berlin. The film's sets were designed by the art director Franz Schroedter.

== Cast ==
- Henny Porten as Gabriele Amberg
- Wolfgang von Schwindt as Graf Torgstädt
- Livio Pavanelli as Lawyer Boretius
- Maria Reisenhofer as Grafin Torgstädt
- Walter Slezak as Ottokar, ihr Sohn
- Iwa Wanja as Komtess Ina Wildborn
- Jenny Marba as Tante Aurelie
- Ludwig Rex as Onkel Eduard
- Paul Westermeier as Vetter Udo
- Sophie Pagay as Haushälterin bei Gabriele
- Leopold von Ledebur
- Max Maximilian as Ein Trainer

== Legacy ==
The film was screened at the Deutsche Kinemathek in 2019.

== Reception ==
The film was noted for bringing together two of the German film stars of the time and described as "an overtitled but undeniably amusing late silent, with good performances from Porten and Walter Slezak as a mismatched pair of lovers".

== Bibliography ==
- Grange, William. Cultural Chronicle of the Weimar Republic. Scarecrow Press, 2008.
