= Emil Utitz =

Czech philosopher and psychologist (1883-1956)

- Emil Utitz giving a lecture in Theresienstadt, still from the 1944 propaganda film Theresienstadt (photographer: Ivan Frič)
- Born: 18 May 1883; Prague, Kingdom of Bohemia, Austria-Hungary
- Died: 2 November 1956 (aged 73); Jena, East Germany

Academic background
- Education: Ludwig-Maximilians-Universität München; German Charles-Ferdinand University; Leipzig University
- Alma mater: Charles University
- Thesis: Wilhelm Heinse und die Ästhetik zur Zeit der deutschen Aufklärung (1906)
- Doctoral advisor: Christian von Ehrenfels
- Influences: Franz Brentano

Academic work
- Discipline: philosopher; psychologist
- Sub-discipline: art theory; aesthetics; characterology; cultural philosophy
- Institutions: University of Rostock; University of Halle-Wittenberg; Charles University
- Doctoral students: Hermann Boeschenstein

Emil Utitz (27 May 1883 – 2 November 1956) was a Czech philosopher and psychologist. He attended school in Prague and was a classmate of Franz Kafka. Utitz studied at the Ludwig-Maximilians-Universität München, Leipzig University, and Charles University in Prague, where he obtained a PhD under Christian von Ehrenfels and was greatly influenced by Franz Brentano. He moved to Germany, where he became a professor in Rostock, and from 1925 was Chair of Philosophy at the University of Halle-Wittenberg. In his research, he was concerned with art theory, aesthetics, characterology and cultural philosophy. During his time at Halle, he chaired the second Congress of Aesthetics and Science of Art. As Utitz was of Jewish descent, he was forced into unpaid retirement in 1933 and returned to Prague, where he held the Chair of Philosophy from 1934 to 1938.

In 1942, Utitz and his wife were deported to Theresienstadt Ghetto. He was given special treatment as "prominent" prisoner, served as head of the Ghetto Central Library and was involved in cultural activities. After the liberation of Theresienstadt in 1945, he helped to disband the library, then returned to Prague. Utitz died in Jena in 1956, while travelling through East Germany to give lectures.

== Early life and education ==
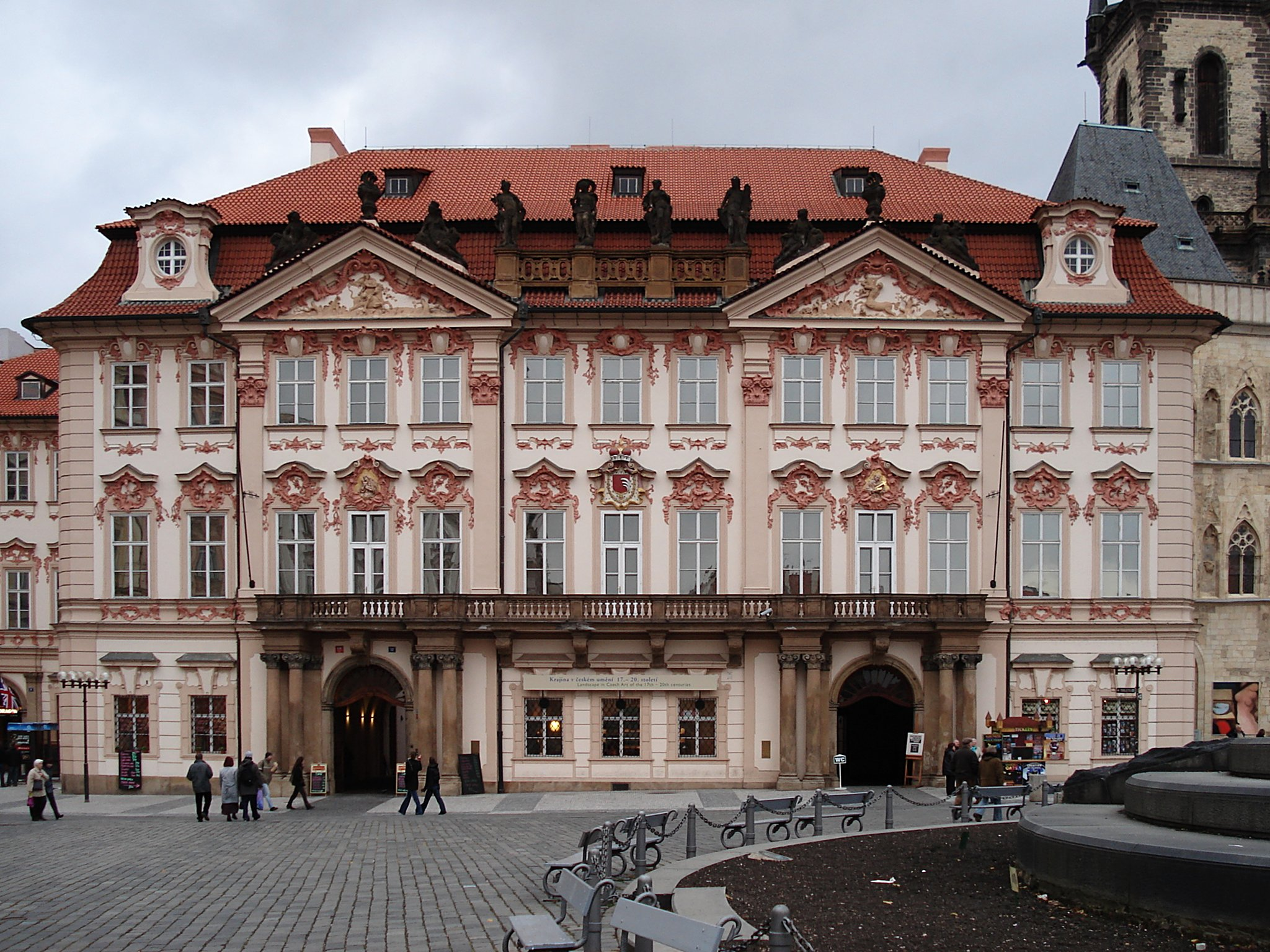
Kinský Palace in Prague, where Utitz and Franz Kafka went to school

Emil Utitz was born in Prague on 27 May 1883. (Note: Many sources claim that he was born in Roztoky, possibly because Roztoky, where he lived at the time, was mentioned in the document confirming his dismissal from German citizenship in 1934.) His parents were Gotthold Utitz (1855–1936), a manufacturer of leather goods, and his wife Philippina. A German-speaking Jew, he grew up with his sister, Flora, and was educated in Prague, first at a Piarist elementary school, then at the Altstädter Gymnasium secondary school in the Kinský Palace, where Franz Kafka was a classmate. After passing his Matura, Utitz studied at the Ludwig-Maximilians-Universität München. After starting to study law in 1901, he moved on to art history and archeology. He returned to Prague to study philosophy at Charles University in 1903, where Anton Marty was one of his teachers. In 1904, he spent one semester studying psychology at Leipzig University, taking classes with Wilhelm Wundt and Johannes Volkelt. He defended his PhD in 1906 under the supervision of Christian von Ehrenfels, with the thesis Wilhelm Heinse und die Ästhetik zur Zeit der deutschen Aufklärung (Wilhelm Heinse and aesthetics in the German Enlightenment). He became a member of a philosophical circle, strongly influenced by Franz Brentano, that met at the Café Louvre and included Kafka and Oskar Kraus. Encouraged by Brentano, Utitz converted to Protestantism in 1908. While Utitz claimed to have done so for spiritual reasons, conversion was at the time beneficial to Jews attempting to have an academic career, and Arnold Zweig later described it as a consequence of the sociopolitical environment of the times.

Utitz also wrote poems. His Von des Lebens letzten Rätseln: Eine lyrische Symphonie in drei Sätzen ('On Life's Final Mysteries: A Lyrical Symphony in Three Movements') appeared in 1902, and in the same year, he used the pseudonym Ernst Limé to publish the collection Meine Hochburg ('My Stronghold').

== Academic career ==
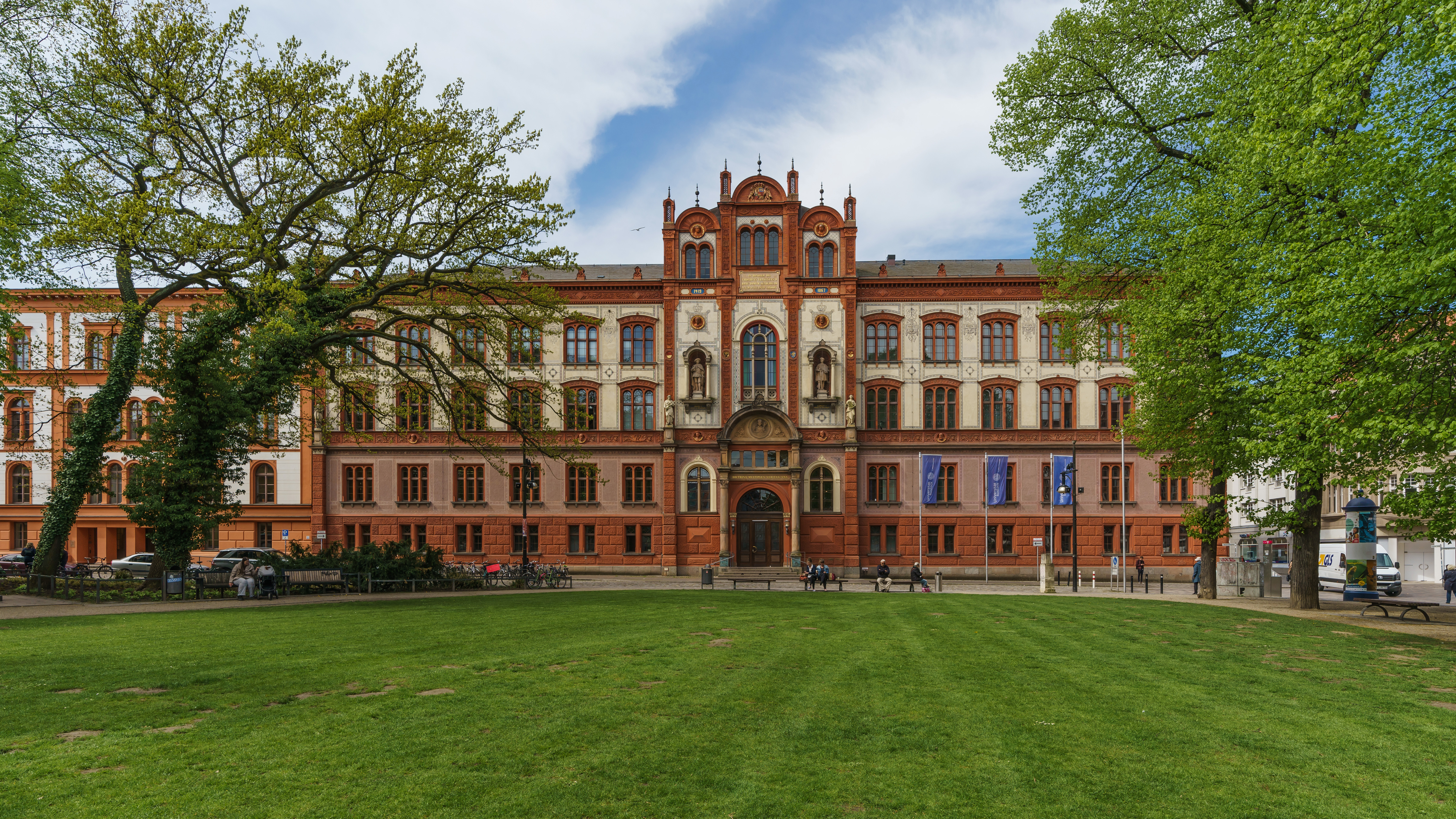
Main building of the University of Rostock

After his doctorate, Utitz travelled to Italy, spending time with Franz Brentano in Florence. Supported by Max Dessoir, he found a teaching position at the University of Rostock in 1910 and obtained the habilitation qualification in November 1910. Utitz worked in Rostock as Privatdozent for philosophy, becoming a titular professor in 1921. He married Ottilie Schwarzkopf, the daughter of a Jewish factory owner from Sušice, in 1914. They had no children. After the start of World War I, Utitz was granted leave from his duties and briefly worked as a secondary school teacher in Prague before returning to Rostock in February 1915. In Rostock, Utitz became acquainted with the artist Ernst Barlach, who appears to have been close to the couple. In the summer term, Utitz occasionally held his exercise classes at the beach in Warnemünde. In 1919, he was briefly a member of the German Democratic Party. In 1924, Utitz and his wife became German citizens.

From October 1925, Utitz held a chair of philosophy at the University of Halle-Wittenberg as successor of Max Frischeisen-Köhler. In 1927, the second Congress of Aesthetics and Science of Art was held in Halle with more than 400 participants from Germany, Switzerland, Austria and Hungary, with Utitz serving as chair of the organising committee. Although he had converted to Protestantism, he was considered Jewish in the context of the so-called Law for the Restoration of the Professional Civil Service and was suspended in April 1933, then forced into retirement in September 1933. He did not receive a pension, with the justification that he had been working in Halle for less than ten years and that his work in Rostock had not been on an ordinary professorship. He returned to Prague, where he first worked on the Nachlass of Franz Brentano, then became the successor of Christian von Ehrenfels as Chair of Philosophy at the German University of Prague in October 1934. On 26 October 1934, his Czechoslovak citizenship was reinstated. He was forced to retire from teaching in 1938 after arguments with Nazi colleagues.

His PhD students include Hermann Boeschenstein (Die Aesthetik des J. P. de Crousaz, The Aesthetics of J. P. de Crousaz, Rostock 1924) and Johannes Güthling (Vergleichende Untersuchungen über das Augenmaß für Strecken und Flächen, Comparative Studies of the Visual Judgement for Distance and Area, Halle 1927).

Utitz's works include books on art theory, aesthetics, characterology and cultural philosophy, as well as books about Brentano and Egon Erwin Kisch. His 1908 book Grundzüge der ästhetischen Farbenlehre ('Foundations of the aesthetic theory of colours') was based on psychological experiments. It included discussions of which combinations of colours are perceived as pleasant and how colours are named. The next book, his habilitation thesis Die Funktionsfreuden im ästhetischen Verhalten (1911) examined the role of emotions in aesthetic pleasure, defined as an "emotional apprehension of the world of representation of values". In 1914 and 1920, the two volumes of Grundlegung der allgemeinen Kunstwissenschaft ('Foundation of the general science of art') appeared; Utitz presents here a study of art that is not based on aesthetics or psychology, but on the study of civilisation. He continued this point of view in his 1932 Geschichte der Ästhetik ('History of Aesthetics').

== Theresienstadt ==
Utitz and his wife were deported to Theresienstadt Ghetto on 30 July 1942. There, he became head of the Ghetto Central Library, which opened in November 1942. The library started with about 4,000 books, most of them theological or scholarly works in Hebrew or German. Within a year, the collection had grown to over 48,000 volumes. When the reading room opened in June 1943, use was restricted to readers who could pay a deposit and pass an interview with Utitz or another librarian. Utitz, who was one of the "prominent" prisoners given special treatment, was involved in cultural activities in Theresienstadt, for example as judge in a poetry contest in 1942 or 1944. He also gave lectures, one of which was filmed for the 1944 propaganda film Theresienstadt. The manuscript of Viktor Ullmann's opera Der Kaiser von Atlantis was saved by Utitz when Ullman was deported to Auschwitz in October 1944 and later given to H. G. Adler. Utitz and his assistant, Käthe Starke-Goldschmidt, who preserved the Theresienstadt Papers, were the only library staff to survive until the liberation of Theresienstadt in May 1945, and spent three more months in the camp to oversee the disbanding of the library, with 100,000 books returned to Prague. Utitz later wrote a book about the psychology of life in Theresienstadt, which appeared in a Czech edition in 1947 and in German translation in 1948.

== Later life and death ==
After the liberation of Theresienstadt, he returned to Prague and was again named professor of philosophy at the university. As emeritus professor, he lived in Smíchov. Utitz became a member of the Communist Party of Czechoslovakia in 1948. While travelling to give lectures in East Germany, he died in Jena on 2 November 1956 from a heart attack.
