= Elsa Bernstein =

Austrian-German writer, dramatist, and literary figure

- Born: Elsa Porges; 27 October 1866; Vienna
- Died: 2 July 1949 (aged 82); Hamburg-Eimsbüttel
- Other names: Ernst Rosmer
- Occupations: writer, playwright
- Notable work: Königskinder
- Spouse: Max Bernstein
- Parent: Heinrich Porges

Elsa Bernstein (née Porges; pseudonym, Ernst Rosmer; 27 October 1866 – 2 July 1949) was an Austrian-German writer, dramatist, and literary figure.

== Life ==
Elsa Porges was born in Vienna, a daughter of Heinrich Porges (a close friend of Richard Wagner). At the age of ten, at her own insistence, she attended the first complete, four-opera performance of The Ring Cycle in Bayreuth in 1876, for which her father served as Wagner's special documentary-archivist. In opera tradition, Elsa is considered to have been the cycle's youngest audience member.

With her marriage to journalist Max Bernstein, she became hostess to one of the most notable musical and literary salons of the late nineteenth and early twentieth centuries. At various times, attendees included Gerhart Hauptmann (whose son married Bernstein's daughter, Eva), Hugo von Hofmannsthal, Engelbert Humperdinck, Henrik Ibsen, Annette Kolb, Hermann Levi, Alma and Gustav Mahler, Thomas Mann, Rainer Maria Rilke, Richard Strauss, Bruno Walter, and Max Weber, among many others.

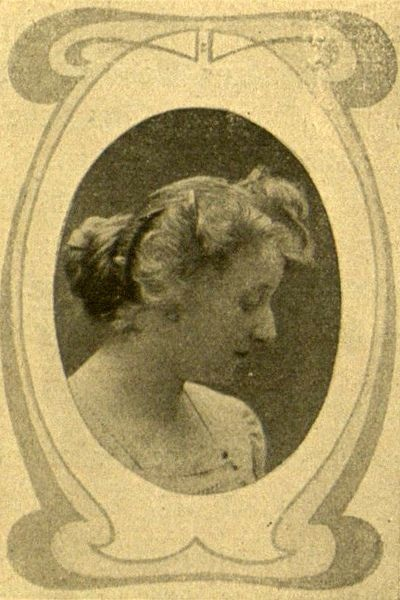
Elsa Bernstein in 1905

She was educated at Munich and for a short time, also was on the stage. A degenerative affliction of the eyes forced her to retire. Thenceforth she devoted herself to dramatic literature. Shortly after her marriage in 1892 to Max Bernstein, she wrote her first play, Wir Drei (English: "We Three"), which created considerable discussion; some saw it as a dramatization of the matrimonial and sexual views of Taine and Zola. (Although written under the pseudonym of Ernst Rosmer, her identity as the author of the play was never secret.) Her next few plays fell short of exciting the same public attention: Dämmerung ("Twilight", 1893); Die Mutter Maria, 1894; Tedeum (1896); Themistokles (1897); and Daguy Peters.

Unbounded admiration was elicited by Königskinder (1895), a dramatic fairy-tale, however. Although its plot was simple, the beauty of the theme and its poetry were such as to class it with Ludwig Fulda's Der Talisman.

Although Engelbert Humperdinck was dissatisfied with his first concert setting of Königskinder in 1897, an avant-garde melodrama that demanded an innovative "speak-singing" technique from its soloists (despite production challenges, it nevertheless enjoyed more than 120 performances across Europe), he persuaded Bernstein, in 1907, to authorize a traditional opera setting that debuted in German at the Metropolitan Opera in New York in December 1910. That version is still performed.

Almost certainly at the instigation of Winifred Wagner, Bernstein was awarded an exit visa for the United States in 1941, but refused to leave her sister Gabriele behind (who like Elsa had lost almost all her eyesight) as she had become her caretaker. Being of Jewish heritage, the two women were transported to Dachau arriving on 25 June 1942, where Bernstein was recognized as the prominent author of Königskinder. As a result, the sisters were sent the following day to Theresienstadt. Gabriele died while they were imprisoned there. Bernstein is listed among those prisoners whose works are noted in the Theresienstadt Papers.

After her liberation in 1945, Elsa Bernstein used a special typewriter for the blind to write a detailed account of her confinement in the camp's Prominentenhaus, or House of Notables. More than five decades after her death, the typescript was discovered by accident and published in German under the title of, Das Leben als Drama. Erinnerungen an Theresienstadt.

== Death ==
Bernstein died, aged 82, in 1949 in Hamburg-Eimsbüttel. Although buried in the same grave as her husband, her name is no longer legible on their shared headstone.

== Literary works ==
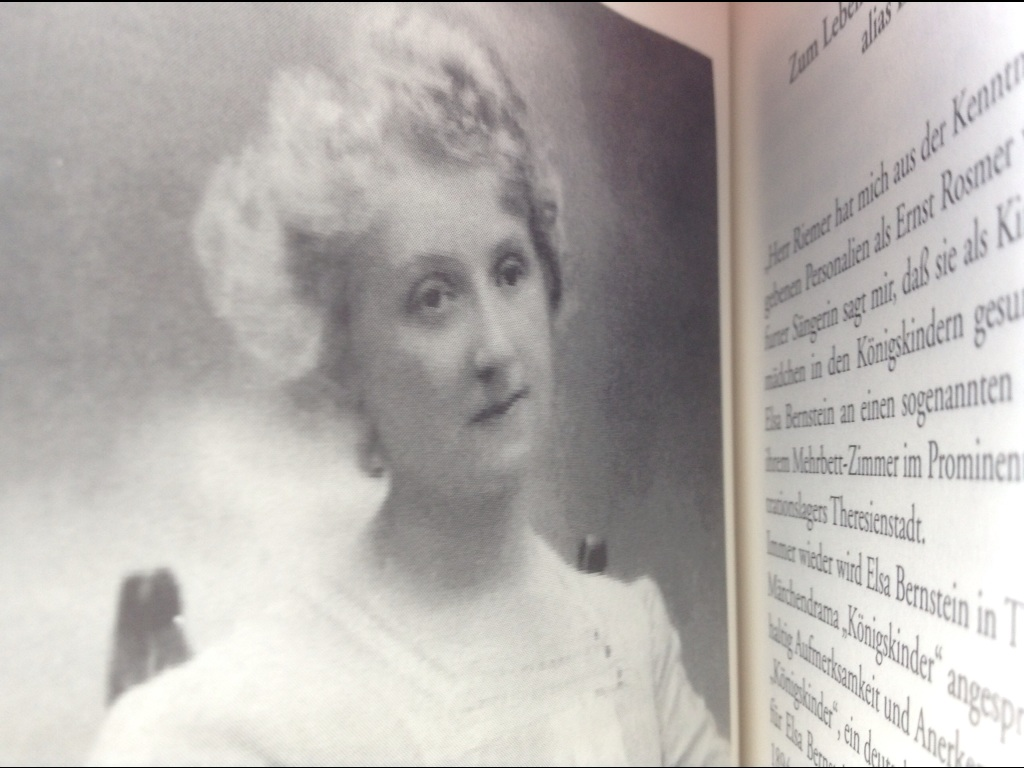
Bernstein's Theresienstadt memoir, Das Leben als Drama (Life as Drama)

Under the pseudonym "Ernst Rosmer"

- Dämmerung (Play, 1893)
- Wir Drei (Drama, 1893)
- Madonna (Novel, 1894)
- Königskinder (Fairy-tale drama, 1895; set to music in 1895 by Engelbert Humperdinck)
- Tedeum (Comedy, 1896)
- Themistokles (Tragedy, 1897)
- Mutter Maria. Totengedicht in fünf Wandlungen (1900)
- Merete (1902)
- Dagny (Drama, 1904)
- Johannes Herkner (Play, 1904)

As "Elsa Bernstein"

- Nausikaa (Tragedy, 1906)
- Maria Arndt (Play, 1908)
- Achill (Tragedy, 1910)
- Das Leben als Drama. Erinnerungen an Theresienstadt (Concentration camp diary, published posthumously in 1999)

== Sources ==
- Jürgen Joachimsthaler: Max Bernstein. Kritiker, Schriftsteller, Rechtsanwalt (1854-1925). Frankfurt/M. et al. 1995. Biography about her husband, containing much biographical material about her as well.
- Ulrike Zophoniasson-Baierl: Elsa Bernstein alias Ernst Rosmer. Bern et al. 1985.

=== Bibliography of the Jewish Encyclopedia ===
- Das Jüngste Deutschland, pp. 317–20
- Kürschner, Deutscher Litteratur-Kalender, 1901, pg. 91
- Lexikon Deutscher Frauen der Feder, i. 61;
  - ib. ii. 203.S
