= Bedřich Fritta =

Czech-Jewish cartoonist (1906–1944)

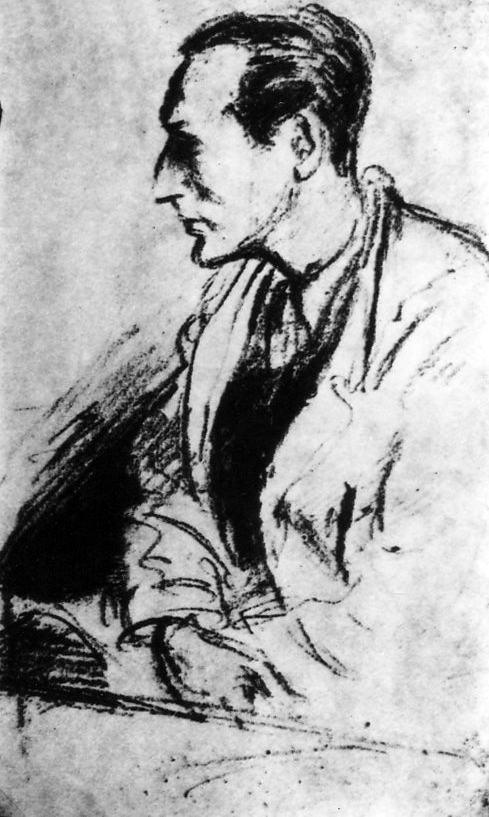
Bedřich Fritta (portrait by Peter Kien, Theresienstadt)

Bedřich Fritta (né Fritz Taussig; 19 September 1906 – 8 November 1944) was a Czech-Jewish artist and cartoonist. He is known for drawings he made while interned in Theresienstadt Ghetto before his death in Auschwitz

== Life ==
Fritta was born Fritz Taussig on 19 September 1906 to a Jewish family in Višňová. After his father's death he moved to Prague with his mother in 1928. In the late 1920s, he lived in Paris for two years working as a caricaturist. When he returned to Prague, he worked as a technical artist for architect Emil Weisz and later as an illustrator for Ladislav Radoměrský's advertisement agency.

In the 1930s, he devoted himself to political caricature for the satirical magazine Simplicus. The magazine was an heir to the German magazine Simplicissimus after its Jewish editor Thomas Theodor Heine left Nazi Germany and went to Czechoslovakia. Taussig published under pseudonym "Fritta" – created from the first letters of his name and surname. From 1934 to 1935, he again lived in Paris. After his return, he had his name legally changed to Bedřich Fritta in 1936. In the same year, he married his wife Johanna Fantlová. They lived in Karlín where Fritta worked as a graphic artist and as an art teacher. Their son Tomáš was born in 1941.

== During WWII ==
In 1941, Fritta was interned in Theresienstadt Ghetto. His wife and son followed him in 1942. Together with other illustrators in the ghetto, Fritta worked as a technical artist. Because of their access to the tools, they were able to illegally draw expressionist sketches of life in the overcrowded ghetto. Together with Leo Haas, Otto Ungar, and Ferdinand Bloch, he was arrested and interrogated. The artists were able to hide their drawings before the arrest. Bloch died in the Small Fortress prison in Theresienstadt. Others were deported to Auschwitz, where Fritta died of illness and exhaustion in 1944. His wife and son were imprisoned in the Small Fortress, where Johanna died of typhus in February 1945. Their son Tomáš survived the Holocaust and was adopted by Leo Haas and his wife Erna. Out of the four arrested artists, only Leo Haas survived the war and recovered the hidden drawings. He displayed these works in Mánes Pavilion after the war. Some of Fritta's surviving works are held by the Jewish Museum Berlin and the Jewish Museum of Switzerland.

== Publications ==
- To Tommy, for his Third Birthday (1999) – A picture book Fritta drew for his son's third birthday.

== Gallery ==
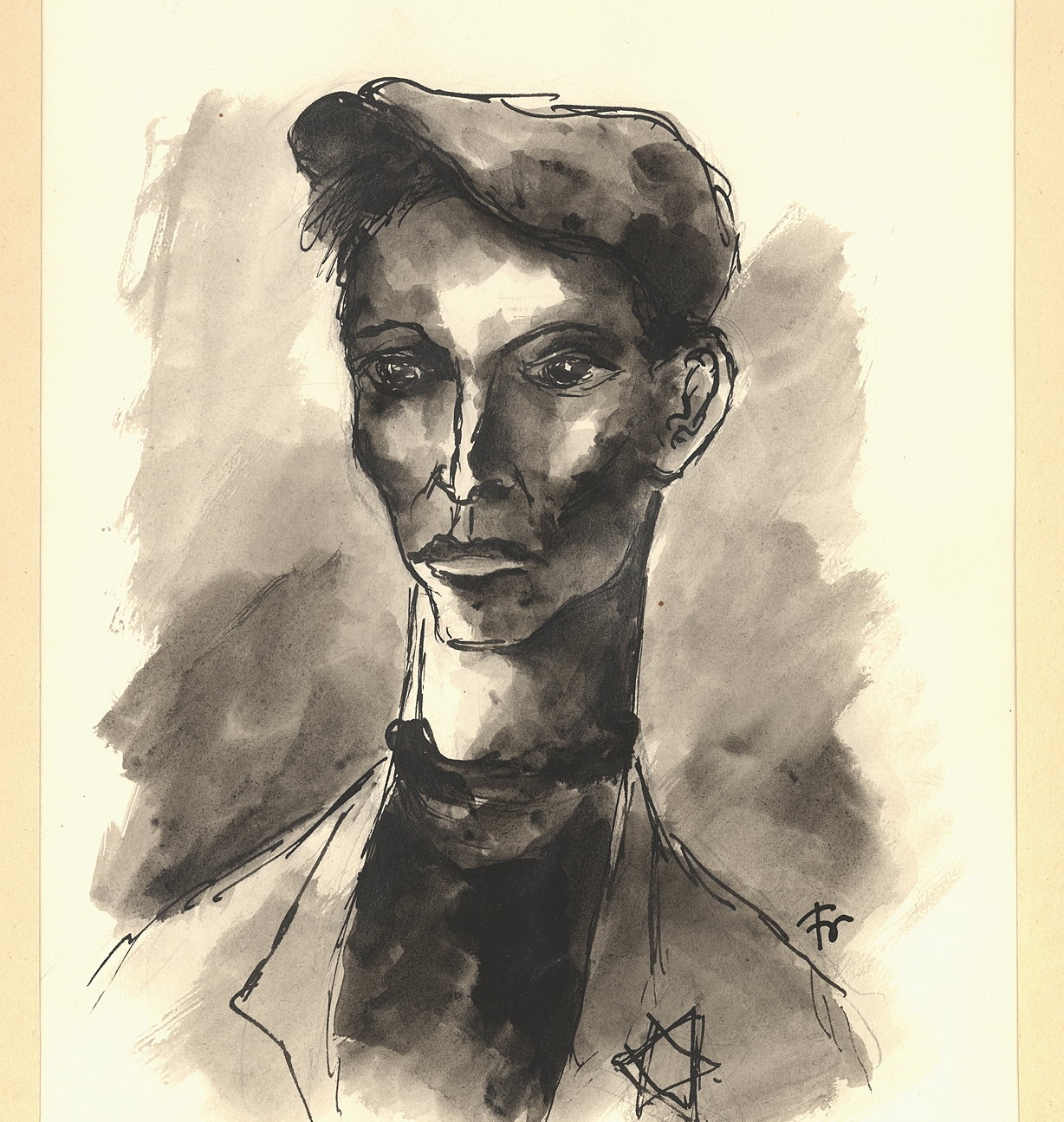
A Jewish worker in Theresienstadt

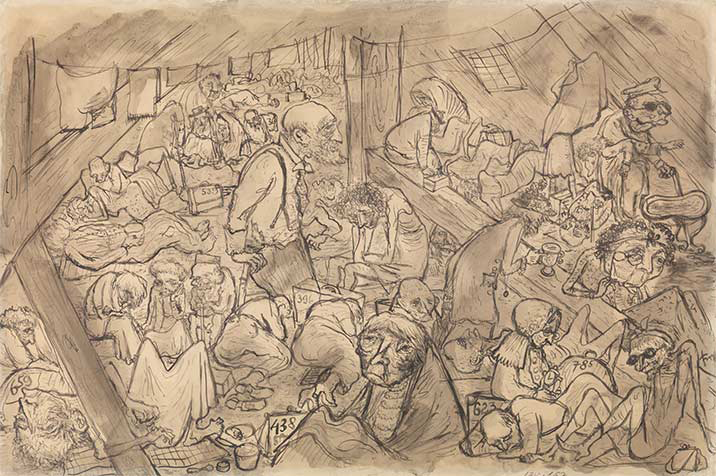
Sleeping quarter in the attics

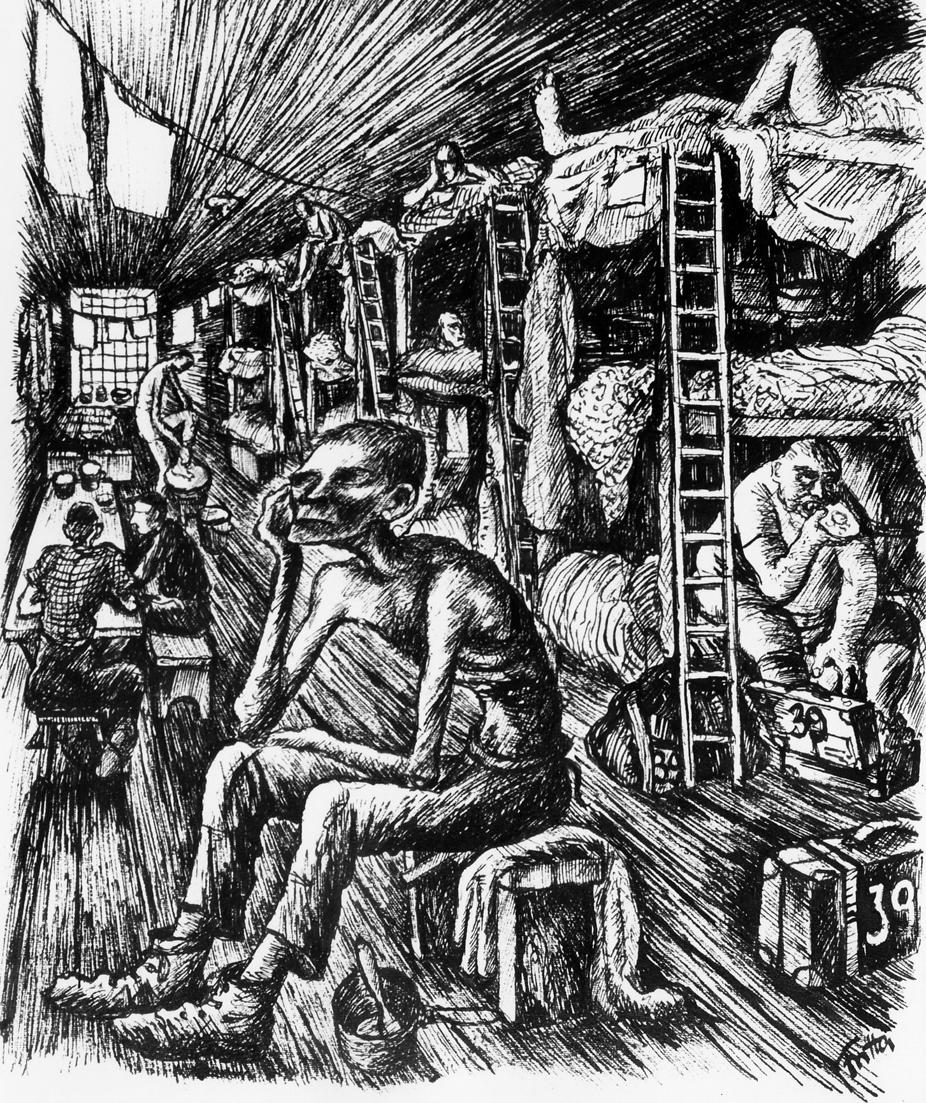
In the Men's Living Quarters

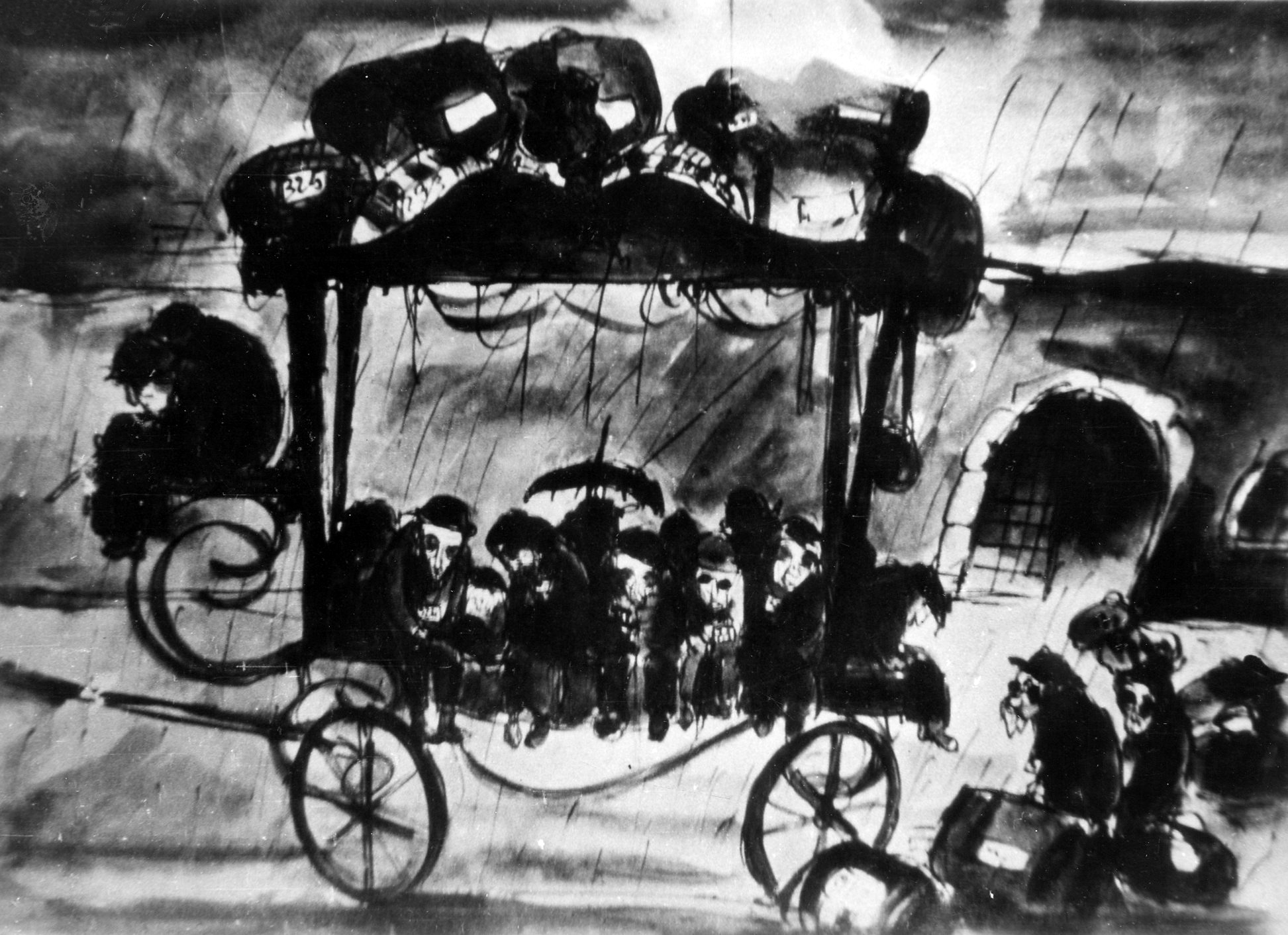
Inmates Conveyed in a Carriage

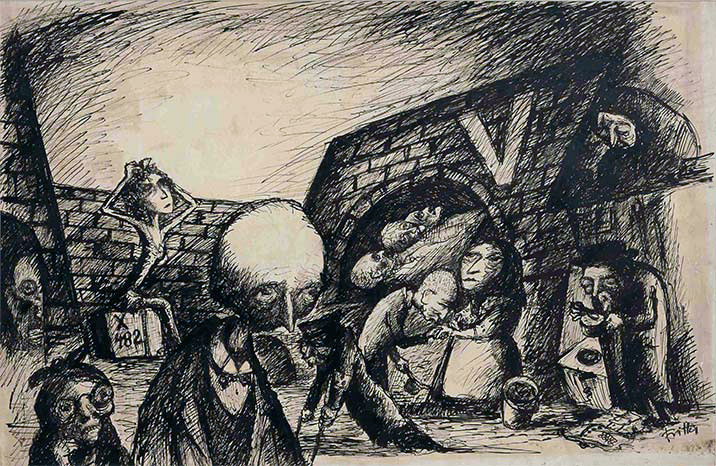
Life and Death in a Courtyard

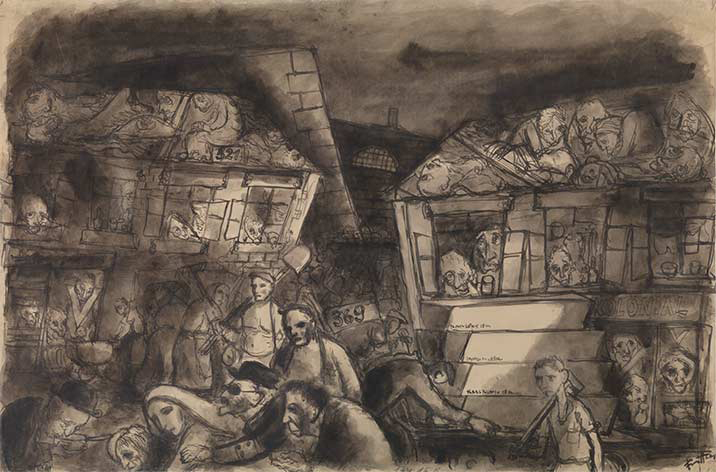
Life in Theresienstadt

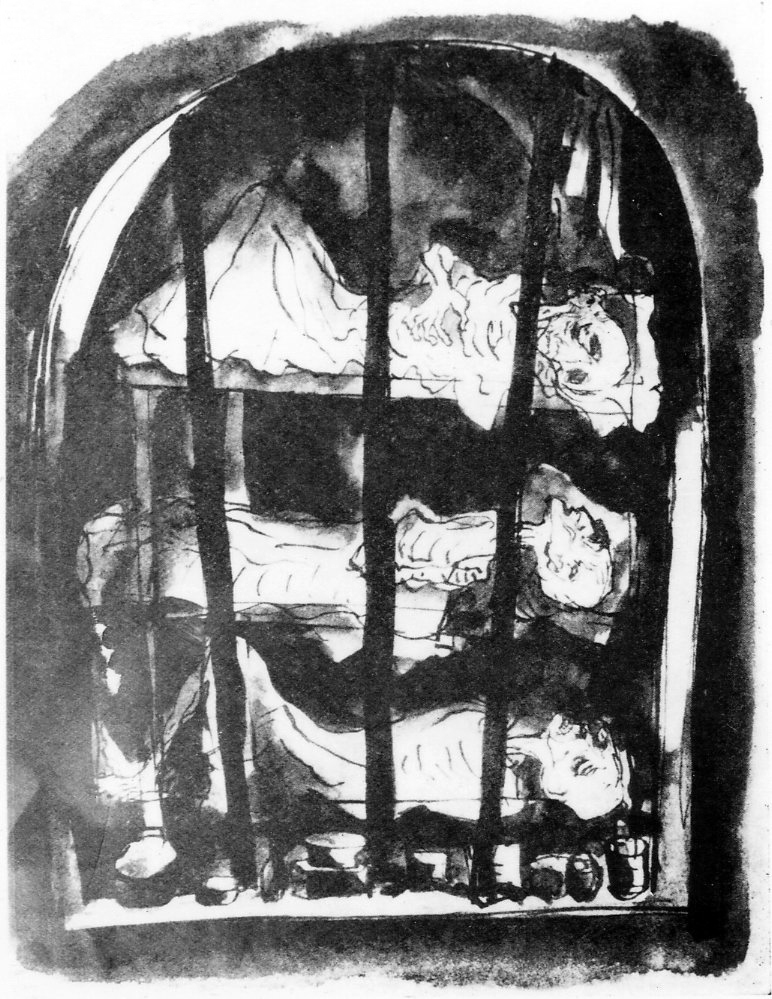
Temporary Living Quarters for the Elderly in One of the Barracks

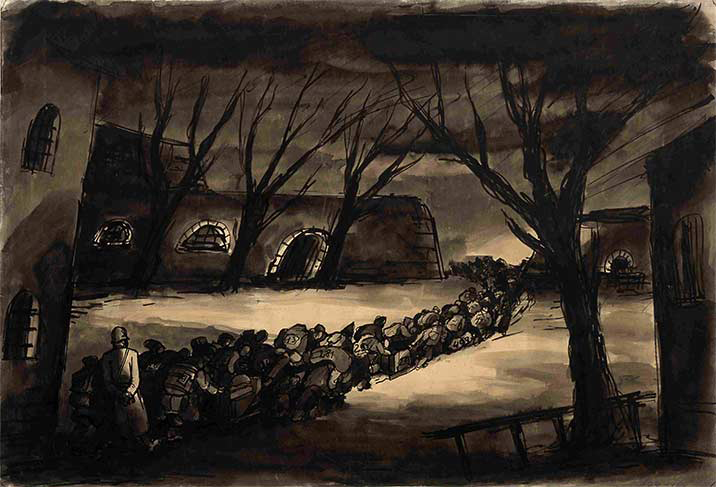
A transport leaves the ghetto

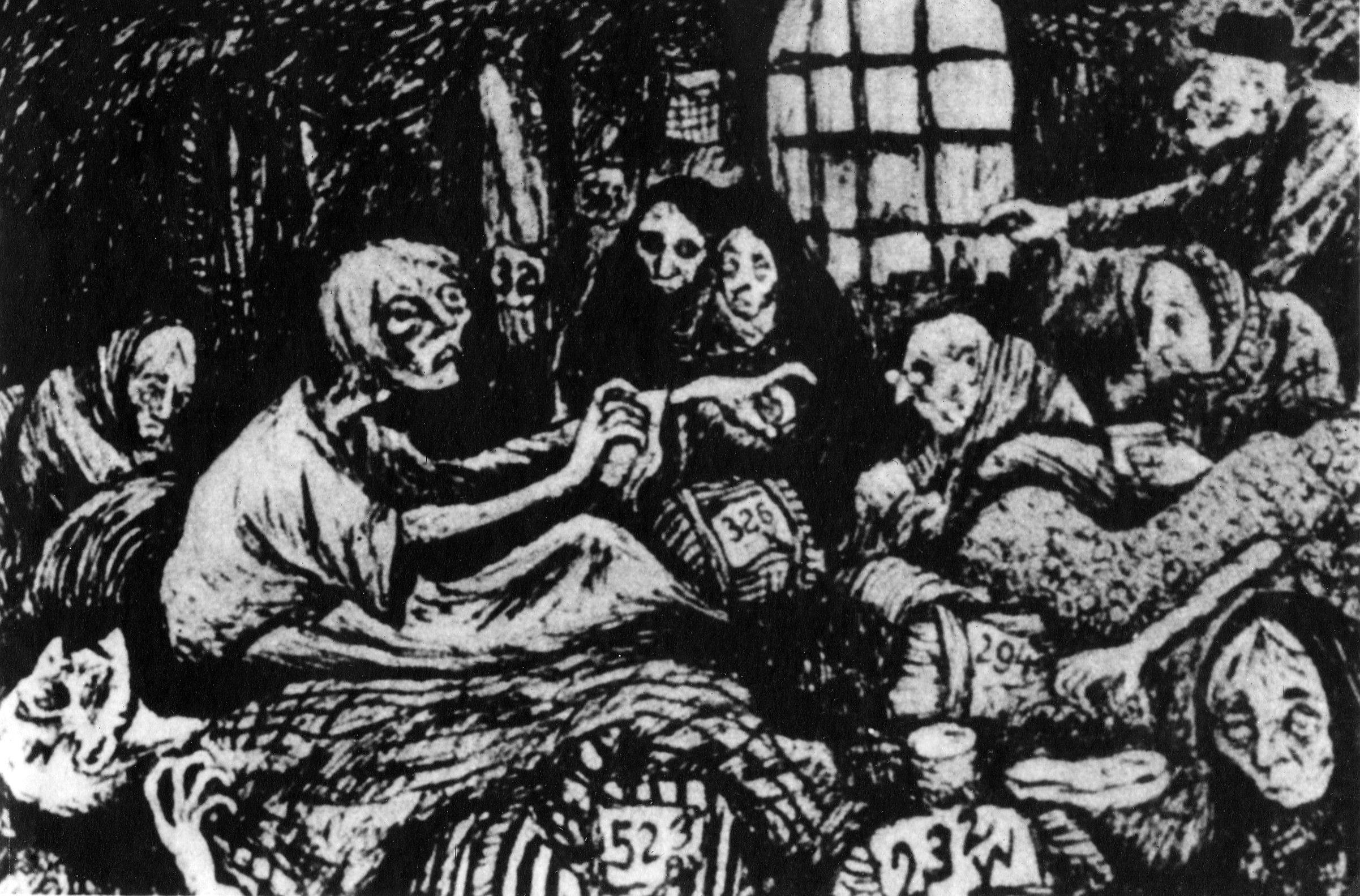
Deportation
