= Benjamin Murmelstein =

Austrian Rabbi

- Photograph of Murmelstein from the Theresienstadt Konvolut, an historical booklet produced by the Jewish self-government in Theresienstadt, ca. 1944
- Born: 9 June 1905; Lvov, Galicia, Austria-Hungary (now Lviv, Ukraine)
- Died: 27 October 1989 (aged 84); Rome, Italy

Benjamin Israel Murmelstein (9 June 1905 – 27 October 1989) was an Austrian rabbi. He was one of 17 community rabbis in Vienna in 1938 and the only one remaining in Vienna by late 1939. An important figure and board member of the Jewish group in Vienna during the early stages of the Second World War, he was also an "Ältester" (council elder) of the Judenrat in the Theresienstadt concentration camp after 1943. He was the only "Judenältester" to survive the Holocaust. He helped thousands of Jews in emigrating and is accused of being a Nazi collaborator.

Murmelstein spent his final years in Rome, repudiated by the Jewish community because of his role in the Holocaust. He was interviewed by Claude Lanzmann in 1975 and was the subject of a posthumous 2013 documentary, The Last of the Unjust, based on the interviews. He died in obscurity, but since the release of the documentary he and his role in the Holocaust have become the subject of increased media and scholarly attention.

== Life up to and through the Holocaust ==
A native of Lviv, Galicia, Benjamin Israel Murmelstein was raised Orthodox Jewish, like his family. After completing his education in Vienna, Murmelstein established himself there, becoming rabbi of a small synagogue, an occasional lecturer at the Vienna University on ancient Jewish history, and—following a speech on the Jewish soldiers whose names were effaced from German war memorials of World War I—a person of interest to the Viennese Jewish community organization, the Israelitische Kultusgemeinde (IKG). As a board member of the IKG, he began after the annexing of Austria into Nazi Germany producing reports which were presented to Adolf Eichmann as part of that man's work emigrating and seizing the property of the Jews.

Murmelstein became deputy chairman of the Jewish Council of Elders in Vienna, a group created by the Nazis, and for years was involved in Eichmann's work to remove Jews from Austria, witnessing the Nazi policies firsthand. In his interviews with Lanzmann decades later, he revealed that he had observed Eichmann, armed with a crowbar, organizing the destruction of Vienna's Seitenstettengasse synagogue during the Kristallnacht pogrom. He worked with the IKG to help over 125,000 Jews leave the country by 1941, but in that year the Germans began closing the borders as their emigration policies were evolving towards those of internment and extermination. In 1943, Murmelstein was himself interned in the Theresienstadt Ghetto, or Terezín, in a former Czechoslovak fortress.

This camp was for many a scam and a lie. Eichmann promised to those Jews who paid him for the privilege the luxuries of a spa in what was billed as a "model ghetto," but while those who paid were "sent off in second-class train compartments well stocked with food and medicine," they found at their destination that they were to "be attacked by guards and dogs." Just as Murmelstein had been a leader of the Viennese Jewish community, he was to become a leader in Theresienstadt as well. The Judenrat of Theresienstadt was, at the time of Murmelstein's arrival, led by Jakob Edelstein. Murmelstein was quickly appointed to this body. He soon became its third-ranking member. After the deportation of Edelstein to Auschwitz in 1944 and the execution of Edelstein's successor, Paul Eppstein, for an alleged escape attempt, Murmelstein took the position of Elder himself in September 1944 and kept it until the camp's liberation by the Russians on 5 May 1945.

During his time in the camp, Murmelstein was actively involved in polishing its image through superficial renovation and beautification that was exploited in propaganda films in 1942 and 1944. These films reputedly contributed to hiding the true nature of the camp from the Red Cross during their 1944 inspection, leading them to declare that the camp was as it appeared to be. Nor was that the only behavior on Murmelstein's part that caused fellow prisoners to fear and revile him, leading him to be nicknamed "Murmelschwein" (conflating his name with the word for "pig"). Murmelstein developed a reputation for ruthless implementation of Nazi policy, for instance driving his fellow prisoners to work in spite of their starvation for 70 hours a week to meet Nazi quotas. This he later described as necessary to avoid the Jewish prisoners being simply exterminated. He also purportedly refused to grant exemptions for deportations to Auschwitz unless a substitution was offered, and he was alleged to accept bribes to keep people from being added to those doomed to that fate.

== Controversy, criticism and life after the Holocaust ==
Whatever his actions and his motivations, for Murmelstein the liberation of Theresienstadt did not immediately lead to lasting freedom, as he was quickly detained by the Czechoslovak government on suspicion of collaboration. However, the Czechoslovak government was unable to build a case, and at the end of 1946 Murmelstein was released to emigrate with his family to Rome. There, he took some form of employment with the Vatican and also worked as a salesman. However, his release did not repair his reputation. The Roman Jewish community refused to enroll him in their registers, and on his death, he was refused interment next to his wife and relegated to a plot on the margins of the Jewish cemetery in Rome. His son was denied the right to recite the Kaddish over his grave.

During his final decades, Murmelstein had made some efforts to restore his reputation. In 1961, he published a memoir of his wartime experiences, Terezin: Il ghetto-modello di Eichmann. He also volunteered to stand as a witness to Eichmann's war crimes at Eichmann's trial before the Jerusalem District Court, but was not called. In spite of his efforts, he lived in obscurity until he was located and extensively interviewed by Shoah film director Claude Lanzmann in 1975. After Murmelstein's death, these interviews would become the basis of a 2013 documentary, The Last of the Unjust, which raised considerable attention to him and invited extensive evaluation of his role. While many reviewers praised the film for its exploration of moral complexities, others criticized it for portraying Murmelstein in a positive light and for factual inaccuracies.

Murmelstein has been compared to Josephus Flavius, a classical Roman-Jewish historian widely regarded as a Jewish traitor whose work Murmelstein himself anthologized in 1938, the same year he began working with the IKG. In his anthology of the classic writer, Murmelstein wrote that the "divided and ambiguous nature [of Flavius] turned him into a symbol of the Jewish tragedy." According to political scientist Anton Pelinka, Murmelstein himself identified with Flavius. He characterized his own behavior during the war and in Theresienstadt as doing the best he could in a bad situation. Israeli-Austrian historian Doron Rabinovici defended the outcome of Murmelstein's behavior. While not speaking to his motivations or endorsing his reportedly overbearing personality, he noted that Austrian Jewish leaders like Murmelstein could have chosen to flee Vienna before 1941 and thus evaded being caught up themselves in the Nazi concentration camps, but instead Murmelstein remained and saved countless lives.
