= Merete =

Merete is a given name. Notable people with the given name include:

- Merete Agerbak-Jensen (born 1967), Norwegian politician
- Merete Ahnfeldt-Mollerup (born 1963), Danish architect, university professor and writer
- Merete Alfsen (born 1950), Norwegian translator
- Merete Morken Andersen (born 1965), Norwegian novelist, children's writer and magazine editor
- Merete Armand (1955–2017), Norwegian actress
- Merete Barker (born 1944), Danish artist
- Merete Fjeldavlie (born 1968), Norwegian alpine skier
- Merete Gerlach-Nielsen (1933–2019), Danish academic
- Merete Erbou Laurent (born 1949), Danish weaver and textile artist
- Merete Møller (born 1978), Danish team handball player
- Merete Myklebust (born 1973), Norwegian footballer
- Merete Pedersen (born 1973), Danish footballer
- Merete Ries (1938–2018), Danish publisher and editor
- Merete Riisager (born 1976), Danish politician
- Merete Skavlan (1920–2018), Norwegian actress, theatre instructor and director
- Merete Van Kamp, Danish actress and singer
- Merete Wiger (1921–2015), Norwegian novelist, author of short stories, children's writer and playwright
