= German Studies Canada =

German Studies Canada/Études Allemandes Canada
- Abbreviation: GSC/ÉAC
- Formation: 1962
- Type: Educational association
- Purpose: to promote German studies in Canada
- Region served: Canada
- Official language: English, French, German
- President: Gabriele Mueller; Associate Professor; Department of Languages, Literatures and Linguistics; York University

German Studies Canada or Études Allemandes Canada (GSC) is a professional, not-for-profit learned society promoting German Studies in Canada. The association was founded as the Canadian Association of University Teachers of German (CAUTG) by professors from twelve Canadian Universities in 1962. Since then, GSC has enabled faculty, graduate students, and supporters to advance German Studies in higher education. For example, since 1973 GSC has administered the Canadian Summer School in Germany, which enables Canadian undergraduates to travel to Kassel to improve their German. The association also helped run the now-defunct Werkstudentenprogramm (Work-Student Program), which allowed Canadian students to spend their summers working in Germany. GSC hosts an annual conference as part of the Congress of the Canadian Federation for the Humanities and Social Sciences, where speakers present research related to German language, literature, culture, and pedagogy. The association also publishes Seminar: A Journal of Germanic Studies through the University of Toronto Press. In 2012, GSC recommended that German departments at Canadian universities update their programs to comply with the Common European Framework of Reference for Languages.

In 2021, the association changed its name to German Studies Canada / Études Allemandes Canada. The name change reflected developments in the field of German Studies and an updated understanding of its members' activities (for example, encompassing research and not only teaching).

== Seminar: A Journal of Germanic Studies ==
Founded in 1965, Seminar publishes scholarship related to German-language material or German-cultural material, and is supported by GSC. Seminar has appeared quarterly since 1974, and since the early 2000s has featured special theme issues that often alternate with general issues.

=== Seminar Editors ===
- Robert Farquharson, 1965–1970
- Michael S. Batts, 1970–1980
- Heinz Wetzel, 1980–1985
- Patrick O'Neill, 1985–1990
- Rodney Symington, 1990–2002
- Raleigh Whitinger, 2002–2011
- Karin Bauer and Andrew Piper, 2011–2016
- Karin Bauer, 2016–2017
- Carrie Smith and Markus Stock, 2017–2022
- Christina Kraenzle and Maria Mayr, 2022-

== Archives ==
There is a Canadian Association of University Teachers of German fond at Library and Archives Canada. The archival reference number is R8252, former archival reference number MG28-V33. The fond covers the date range 1952 to 1985. It consists of 3.675 meters of textual records.

== Prizes ==
The association occasionally awards the Hermann Boeschenstein medal to "a person – normally a Germanist at a Canadian university – who has made exceptional contributions, in the humanitarian spirit of Hermann Boeschenstein, to the welfare of our Association and to the advancement of our discipline in Canada."

== See also ==
- List of learned societies
- Canadian Federation for the Humanities and Social Sciences
- Common European Framework of Reference for Languages
