= Heinrich Porges =

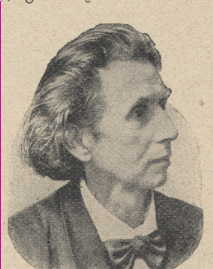
Heinrich Porges (1837-1900)

Heinrich Porges (November 25, 1837 – November 17, 1900) was a Czech-Austrian choirmaster, music critic and writer of Jewish descent.

== Life ==
Heinrich Porges was born in Prague, the son of Simon Porges (1801–1869) and his wife Charlotte. He originally studied Philosophy and Law in Prague, later turning to music. In 1863 he became an assistant of the critic Franz Brendel in editing the Neue Zeitschrift für Musik in Leipzig. In 1867 he produced the arts pages of the Süddeutsche Presse in Munich. He remained there as music critic of the Münchner Neueste Nachrichten from 1880.

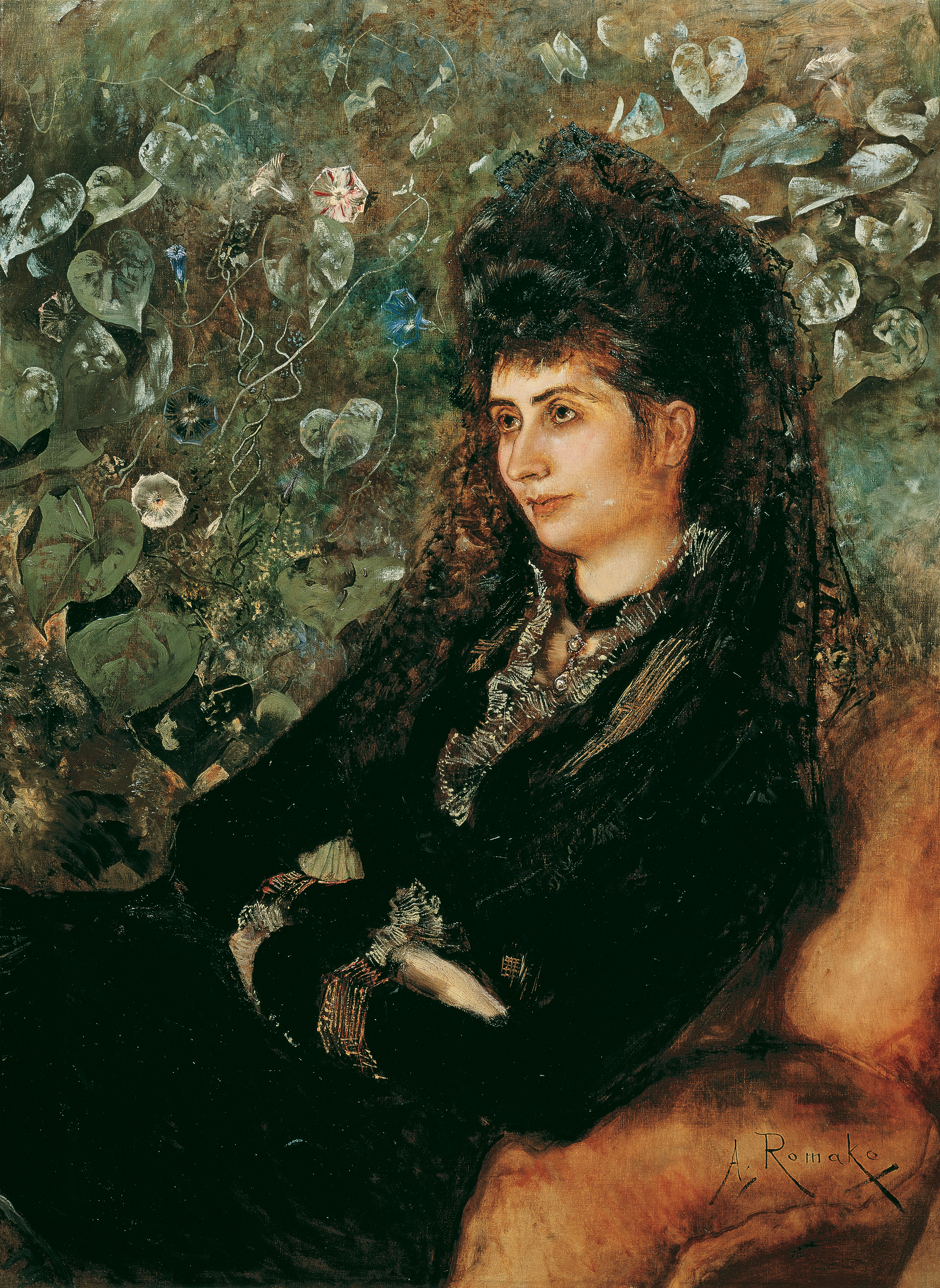
Portrait of Heinrich's sister, Mathilde Porges Stern by Anton Romako

Porges became a devotee and intimate of Richard Wagner despite Wagner's antisemitism, and his extensive notes on Wagner's rehearsal and staging were published in the journal Bayreuther Blätter over the period 1880-1896. His study of Tristan und Isolde was published after his death in 1906 by Hans von Wolzogen. He received a life pension from King Ludwig II of Bavaria.

in 1886 he formed the 'Porges Choir' to promote the music of his favoured composers including Hector Berlioz and Anton Bruckner.

Porges married Wilhelmine Merores; the writer Elsa Bernstein was their daughter. His death in 1900 occurred during a rehearsal of Franz Liszt's oratorio, Christus, at Munich.

== Sources ==
- Austrian Music Dictionary online (in German)
- Porges website
