= The Last of the Unjust =

- Le Dernier des injustes
- Directed by: Claude Lanzmann
- Release date: 2013
- Country: France
- Language: French

The Last of the Unjust (original French title:Le Dernier des injustes) is a 2013 French documentary film directed by Claude Lanzmann that centres on the activities of Rabbi Benjamin Murmelstein in the Theresienstadt concentration camp, during The Holocaust.
