= Merete Erbou Laurent =

Danish weaver and textile artist

Merete Erbou Laurent (born 1949) is a Danish weaver and textile artist. Since the 1970s, she has specialized in weaving paper yarn to produce brightly coloured floor rugs, runners and carpets but more recently has used wool for her rugs. From 1983 to 2006, she was editor-in-chief of the Danish arts and crafts journal Dansk Kunsthåndværk and from 2011 to 2017 served as chair of the Danish designers' association Danske Kunsthåndværkere & Designere.

== Biography ==
Born on 26 January 1949 in Randers, Merete Erbou Laurent is the daughter of Carsten Gylling Erbou (1923–1998), a farmer, and Helga Kirkegaard (born 1926). The eldest of four children, she was brought up in a farming household near Hadsten in Central Jutland. She learnt to weave at home from an early age and acquired her own loom when she was 16. From 1966 to 1970, she studied handicrafts under at the Jutland Art Academy in Aarhus, specializing in weaving under Anna Thommesen.

In 1969, she married the painter Erik Laurent (born 1942) and moved to Thy with whom she had two children. When the marriage was dissolved in 1977, she moved with her children to a collective community in Djursland. There she met her second husband, the editor and publisher Martin Kristen Schultz (born 1950) with whom she later had two children. From 1985, at exhibitions throughout Denmark, she presented her rugs which typically were decorated with geometric designs in clear but pale colours.

In the early 1980s, Erbou Laurent joined the Danish handicrafts association Danske Kunsthåndværkere. From 1983 she began to contribute to the association's journal Dansk Kunsthåndværk, becoming editor in 1986. Under her influence, its scope was extended to cover a wide range of interests, including textiles, ceramics, jewellery and their combinations. From 2011 to 2017 she chaired the Danish designers' association Danske Kunsthåndværkere & Designere.
