= Bayreuther Blätter =

Monthly newsletter about the Bayreuth Festival (1878–1938)

Bayreuther Blätter ("Bayreuth Pages") was a monthly journal founded by Richard Wagner in 1878 and edited by Hans von Wolzogen until his death in 1938. It was written primarily for visitors to the Bayreuth Festival.

The newsletter carried frequent articles by Wagner himself as well as contributions from many of his circle. Some of these were very substantial; for example, Wagner's essays Religion and Art (October 1880) and Heroism and Christianity (September 1881). From 1880 to 1896 the journal carried extracts from the detailed recollections by Heinrich Porges of Wagner's rehearsal and staging techniques.

The journal also had a political focus. In its pages, writers expressed support for Otto von Bismarck and the German Empire. After Germany's defeat in World War I, it showed opposition to the Weimar Republic, eventually supporting Adolf Hitler and Nazi Germany. Great men of German cultural history were celebrated in the Bayreuther Blätter. From 1887, each issue began with an epigraph from such men. The majority were taken from Johann Wolfgang von Goethe, Friedrich Schiller, Arthur Schopenhauer, Wagner, Franz Liszt, Thomas Carlyle, and Martin Luther. Others, like Carl von Clausewitz, Houston Stewart Chamberlain, Paul von Hindenburg, Paul de Lagarde and Hitler, were also drawn upon. In its last years, it increasingly "nazified" Wagner, linking his work with the ideology of National Socialism.

The Bayreuther Blätter remains an important source of information about the Bayreuth Festival in Wagner's last years and about the opinions of his devoted followers.

The critic Eduard Hanslick wrote in 1882:

For a later age, which will be able to look back at the Wagner epidemic of our days in a spirit of calm evaluation, if also one of incredulous astonishment, the Bayreuther Blätter may yet prove to be of no little cultural-historical significance ... The future cultural historian of Germany will be able to give authentic testimony, on the basis of the first five volumes of this journal, of how strongly the delirium tremens of the Wagnerian intoxication raged amongst us, and what sort of abnormalities of thought and feeling it occasioned in the 'cultured' people of its time
