= Hans von Wolzogen =

German man of letters, editor and publisher

Baron Hans Paul von Wolzogen (13 November 1848 in Potsdam – 2 June 1938 in Bayreuth), was a German man of letters, editor and publisher. He is best known for his connection with Richard Wagner.

== Childhood ==
Wolzogen's father, Alfred von Wolzogen, was a court theatrical director in Schwerin; his mother (a daughter of the famous architect Karl Friedrich Schinkel) died when her son was two years old. As a schoolboy, Wolzogen was already interested in music and the theatre.

It was while on his honeymoon in 1872 that he first visited Bayreuth, where shortly before, on 22 May (Wagner's birthday), the foundation-stone had been laid for the Bayreuth Festspielhaus.

== In Bayreuth ==
Wagner invited Wolzogen to Bayreuth in 1877 to edit the Wagnerian publication Bayreuther Blätter. Wolzogen stayed at that post until his death.

From 1878 he lived on the Schillerstrasse, not far from Wagner's house Wahnfried.

After Wagner's death Wolzogen became a central figure of the so-called 'Wahnfried circle', which tried to load the dead master's work with pseudo-religious meaning.

== Literary work ==
Wolzogen produced a biography of Wagner and several essays. He was also the editor of three volumes of Wagner's letters and poems. Perhaps his most significant achievement, however, was his series of 'thematic guides' to Wagner's later dramas. In these publications he identified many of the so-called 'leading motives' and gave them names that in many cases are still in use today.

Wolzogen's small book 'A Guide Through the Music of Richard Wagner's Ring of the Nibelung ' was published in 1878, two years after the original production of the tetralogy at Bayreuth. He also wrote a popular book on Nordic mythology titled Die Edda: Germanische Götter- und Heldensagen in 1920.
