= Anna Thommesen =

Danish textile artist and painter

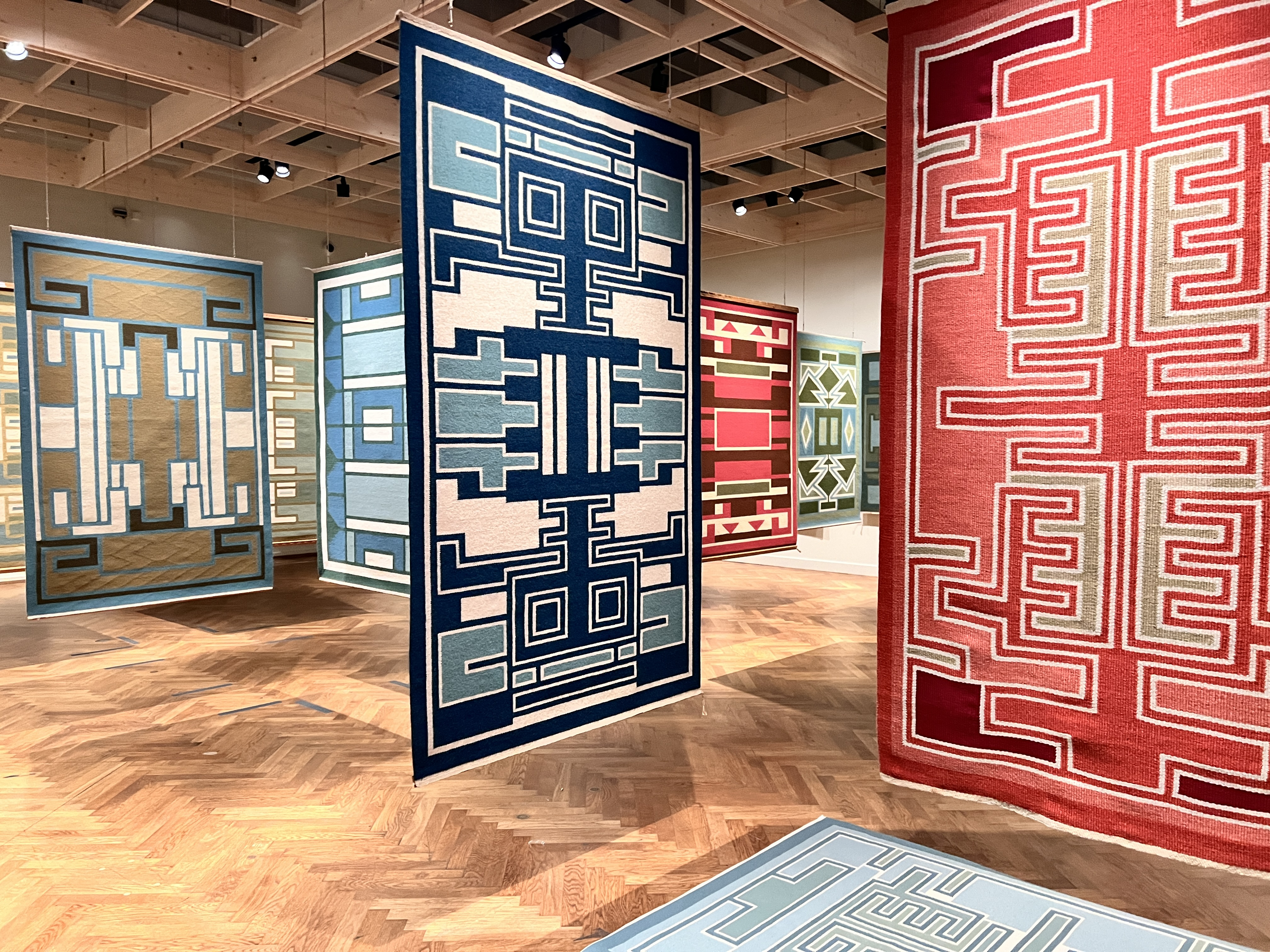
Thommesen's work on display at a dedicated exhibition in the National Gallery of Denmark, 2026

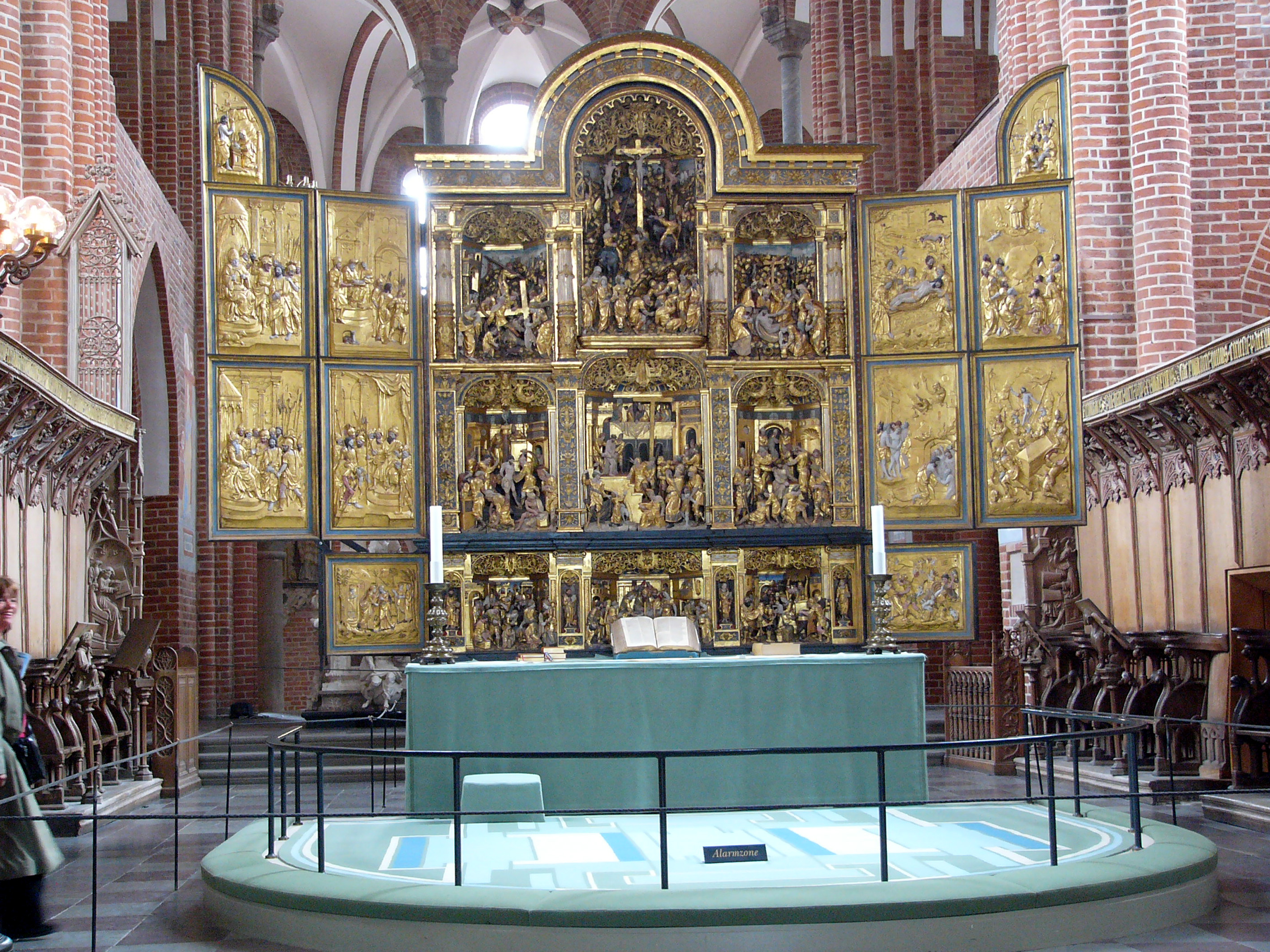
Anna Thommesen's geometrically patterned altar carpet in Roskilde Cathedral (1977)

Anna Thommesen née Jepsen (1908–2004) was a self-taught Danish textile artist and painter. In an austere, geometrical style, she wove tapestries and rugs on a loom she developed herself. She is also remembered as a colourist, creating dyes from the plants she collected. Her works include tapestries for the town hall in Holstebro, a tapestry in the old Landsting Parliament Chamber at Christiansborg Palace and an altar carpet and kneeler in Roskilde Cathedral.

== Biography ==
Born on 10 September 1908 in Copenhagen, Anna Jepsen was the daughter of the ship captain Jep Olivarius Jepsen (1879–1947) and Anna Sørine Louise née Slengerik (1880–1960). She had a brother and two sisters. In 1928, she married the accountant Jens Marius Olsen with whom she had one child, Annelise (1933). After the marriage was dissolved in 1940, she married the sculptor Erik Thommesen, with whom she had three children: Lene (1942), Klaus (1945) and Viggo (1949).

She had no formal education but developed her artistic skills, drawing and painting as a child. When she grew older, she performed various jobs in offices and factories as well as a housemaid. After leaving her daughter Annelise to her first husband after the divorce, she married Thommesen, the son of the owner of the factory where she was working. They moved to the island of Bornholm where Thommesen was involved in the resistance together with his many artistic colleagues. Life there with their three small children proved difficult during the war years. While on Bornholm, she developed her weaving skills, first producing cloth weaves which she exhibited at Den Frie Udstilling's autumn show in 1943. Even at this early stage, her interest in geometrical designs was evident.

Thommesen developed her own approach to design and weaving, first sketching her designs, colouring them in watercolours and then producing the weaves directly on her loom rather than in the form of cartoons. Inspired by nature, her abstract depictions were executed with intuitive perfectionism, demonstrating her interest in clarity and purity and reflecting the constructivist trends of the times.

Anna Thommesen died on 6 January 2004 and is buried in Blistrup Churchyard in Græsted.
