= Leo Haas =

German painter and caricaturist

- Born: April 15, 1901; Troppau, Austria-Hungary
- Died: August 13, 1983 (aged 82); East Berlin, East Germany
- Known for: Painting; graphic; drawing

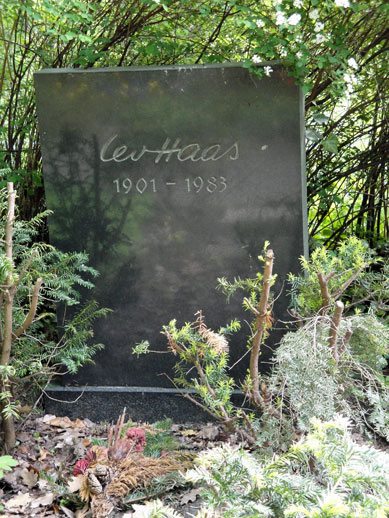
Tomb of Leo Haas in the series of artists' graves in the Central Cemetery Friedrichsfelde.

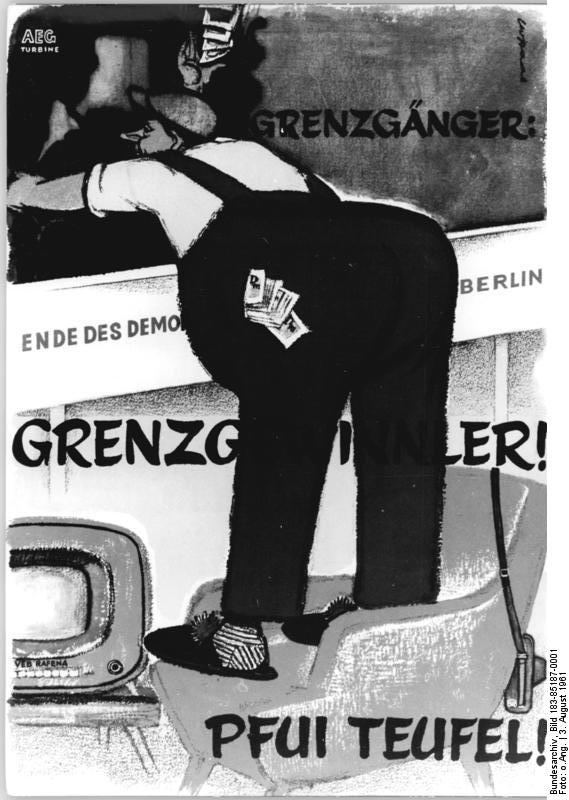
Cross-border, poster by Leo Haas.

Leo Haas (15 April 1901 – 13 August 1983) was a German painter, graphic artist, draughtsman and caricaturist.

== Life ==
Born in Opava, Silesia, Austria-Hungary, Haas studied at the Staatliche Akademie der Bildenden Künste Karlsruhe from 1919 to 1922 and then in Berlin with Emil Orlik and Willy Jaeckel. He worked from 1926 as a painter, graphic artist, press artist and caricaturist in Vienna and later in his hometown Opava in Czechoslovakia.

After the Nazi Occupation of Czechoslovakia in 1939, Haas, who came from a middle-class Jewish family, was deported to the "Juden-KZ" Nisko, a forced labor camp personally supervised by Adolf Eichmann. Haas was one of the 500 inmates who were then later returned to their home towns.

In late autumn 1942, he and his wife were deported to the Theresienstadt concentration camp, where he joined the group of artists of Theresienstadt around Bedřich Fritta from Prague. Among other things, they managed to smuggle drawings about the conditions of life in Theresienstadt into neutral foreign countries. In 1944, the Gestapo officers of the concentration camp command and Adolf Eichmann accused them of this in personally conducted interrogations. The artists and their family members were taken to the cells of the Small Fortress prison and later to other concentration camps. Haas was the only painter of Theresienstadt who survived imprisonment. Immediately before being taken for interrogation, the artists managed to produce many hundreds of drawings and also to hide the picture book For Tommy on his third birthday in Theresienstadt 22.1.1944 by Bedřich Fritta for his son Tomáš. After the liberation Haas was able to recover the drawings. The book was published in 1985.

On 28 October 1944, Haas became prisoner no. 199 885 in Auschwitz concentration camp. There, too, he managed to draw. On 27 November 1944, Haas was transferred to the Sachsenhausen concentration camp to the Sonderkommando for Counterfeiting, together with other "specialists" and the note "return undesired". There he was charged with, among other things, forgery of British Stamps. Towards the end of the war, the prisoners of the counterfeiting squad were taken to KZ Mauthausen and later to Ebensee concentration camp together with the printing presses. There they were liberated by American troops shortly after their arrival on 6 May 1945.

After 1945, Haas lived in Prague with his wife Erna, who had also survived the Theresienstadt concentration camp, the Small Fortress Theresienstadt, Auschwitz and other concentration camps, as a press artist. In his biography, he emphasised that he had consciously chosen this path and against a "pure" artistic career as a painter because of his concentration camp experiences. His wife died in 1955 as a result of medical experiments in Auschwitz.

In the Gestapo prison Small Fortress Theresienstadt, Erna Haas took intensive care of Bedřich Fritta's three-year-old son, Tomáš. After their liberation in 1945, they adopted Tomáš Fritta. Bedřich Fritta was murdered in Auschwitz in November 1944; his wife died in the Small Fortress in Theresienstadt.

From 1955, Haas lived in East Berlin, where he worked as a cartoonist for the Neues Deutschland, the Eulenspiegel and other newspapers. To the latter magazine he contributed from the first issue (1954) a total of 1185 drawings until 1982. For his 70th birthday, DEFA created the documentary Zeichner – Zeuge – Zeitgenosse.

Haas died in East Berlin at the age of 82 and was buried in the artists' section of the Zentralfriedhof Friedrichsfelde.

== Works ==
- Stanić, Dorothea (1979). Kinder im KZ (in German). Berlin (West): Elefanten Press Verlag. ISBN 3-88520-021-X. OCLC 7733850.
- Haas, Leo (1983). Leo Haas : Terezín 1942–1944 (in Czech and English). Praha: Oswald. ISBN 80-85433-73-7. OCLC 33941202.
- Schulenburg, Bodo (1983). Illustrations by Leo Haas: Es war einmal ein Drache ... eine Weihnachtsgeschichte. Berlin: Junge Welt.
- Fritta, Bedřich (1985). Für Tommy zum dritten Geburtstag in Theresienstadt 22. 1. 1944 (in German). Pfullingen Germany: Neske. ISBN 3-7885-0269-X. OCLC 13282184.
- Burger, Adolf (1987). Des Teufels Werkstatt im Fälscherkommando d. KZ Sachsenhausen (in German). Berlin: Verlag Neues Leben. ISBN 3-355-00494-4. OCLC 74840114.
- Goral-Sternheim, Arie (1991). Rendsburger Kulturkreis in collaboration with Schleswig-Holsteinisches Landesmuseum (ed.). KZ-Transit Theresienstadt: Bilder und Dokumente aus Ghettos und Lagern. Introduced and commented by Arie Goral-Sternheim. With a contribution by Frauke Dettmer and texts by H. G. Adler und Leo Haas. Rendsburg: Jüdisches Museum Rendsburg.
