= Pringsheim =

Pringsheim is a Jewish Silesian surname. Notable people with the surname include:

- Alfred Pringsheim (1850–1941), mathematician, father-in-law of writer Thomas Mann
- Ernst Pringsheim Sr. (1859–1917), German physicist
- Ernst Pringsheim Jr. (1881–1970), German botanist
- Klaus Pringsheim Sr. (1883–1972), German composer, conductor, twin brother of Katharina Pringsheim
- Nathanael Pringsheim (1823–1894), German botanist
