= Max Bernstein =

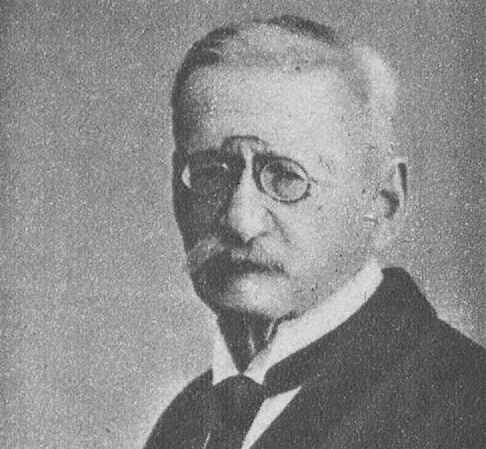
Image of Max Bernstein

Max Bernstein (May 12, 1854, Fürth – March 5, 1925, München) was a German art and theatre critic and author. He was the husband of Elsa Bernstein.

== The Salon Bernstein ==
Bernstein and his wife Elsa had one of the most prominent salons during the millennium. Guests included Theodor Fontane, Henrik Ibsen, Paul Heyse, Gerhart Hauptmann, Hermann Levi, Thomas Mann, Gustav Mahler, Ludwig Ganghofer, Ludwig Thoma, Frank Wedekind, Hugo von Hofmannsthal, Rainer Maria Rilke, Max Halbe, Hermann Sudermann, Otto Brahm, Ricarda Huch, Eduard von Keyserling, Georg Hirth, Erich Mühsam, Klabund, Franziska zu Reventlow, Annette Kolb, Tilla Durieux, Richard Strauss, Engelbert Humperdinck, Bruno Walter, Franz von Stuck, Olaf Gulbransson, Friedrich August von Kaulbach, Maximilian Harden, and Max Weber.

== Works ==
- Der kleine Hydriot (art critic, 1884)
- Münchener Bunte Mappe (anthology, 1884)
- Kleine Geschichten (stories, 1888)
- Münchener Jahresausstellung von Kunstwerken aller Nationen (1889)
- Blau (comedy, 1894)
- D’ Mali (play, 1903)
- Narrische Leut’ (stories, 1904)
- Herthas Hochzeit (comedy, 1907)
- Die Sünde (comedy, 1909)
- Der gute Vogel (comedy, 1913)
- Herrenrecht (play, 1916)
- Gesindel (play, 1921)
- Theaterbriefe (critiques in the Münchner Neueste Nachrichten)
