= Ernst Pringsheim Sr. =

German physicist (1859–1917)

Ernst Pringsheim Sr. (11 July 1859 – 28 June 1917) was a German physicist. He was born and died in Breslau. Alongside Otto Lummer, he conducted significant measurements of the blackbody radiation spectrum, leading to Max Planck's quantum hypothesis in 1900.

== Literary works ==
- Ueber das Radiometer. Berlin: Lange, 1882. Berlin, Universität, Dissertation, 1882.
- Eine Wellenlängenmessung im ultrarothen Sonnenspectrum. In: Annalen der Physik und Chemie. Neue Folge, Band XVIII, (1883).
- (with Otto Lummer:) A Determination of the ratio k of the specific heat for air, oxygen, carbon-dioxide and hydrogen. (= Smithsonian Contributions to Knowledge; 29,6 = 1126 Hodgkins Fund) Washington : Smithsonian Inst., 1898.
- Vorlesungen über die Physik der Sonne. Leipzig: Teubner, 1910.
- Fluoreszenz und Phosphoreszenz im Lichte der neueren Atomtheorie, 1928.
