= Valtr Eisinger =

Czech resistance fighter (1913–1945)

Valtr Eisinger (27 May 1913 – 15 January 1945) was a Czech teacher and resistance fighter at Theresienstadt concentration camp. There, he made possible the publication of the magazine Vedem ("we lead") that consisted of poems, stories and drawings from young people, aged twelve to fifteen. He was murdered by the Nazi regime on one of the death marches.

== Life and death ==
Valtr Eisinger was the son of Adolf Eisinger (1878–1944) and Julie née Eisinger (1879–1944). He had five siblings, sisters Therese (born 1903) and Martha (1905), brothers Sigmund (1902), Bruno (born on 24 November 1907) and Viktor (1908). He became a teacher and married Věra née Sommerová (born on 30 March 1922).

His last residence before deportation was in Brno. On 28 January 1942 he was deported with Transport U from Brno to Theresienstadt. His transport number was 930 of 1,001. In Theresienstadt, he was appointed to supervise the boys in one of the foster homes in L 417. He was also active in the Communist resistance group in Theresienstadt and collaborated with Friedl Dicker-Brandeis, Margita and Miroslav Kárný, Josef Stiassny, Josef Taussig and Bruno Zwicker. In his work with the youth he furthered the concept of self-administration, procured secret teaching and was supported by his close friend Bruno Zwicker (1907–1944), a former representative of the Brno School of Sociology. Tomas Brod, born 1929, later reported: "The Jewish administration did not have enough money to improve the situation for all prisoners, and so it took most care of the children and young people, since in them it saw hope for the future. This is why we, in the children's houses, lived in somewhat better conditions."

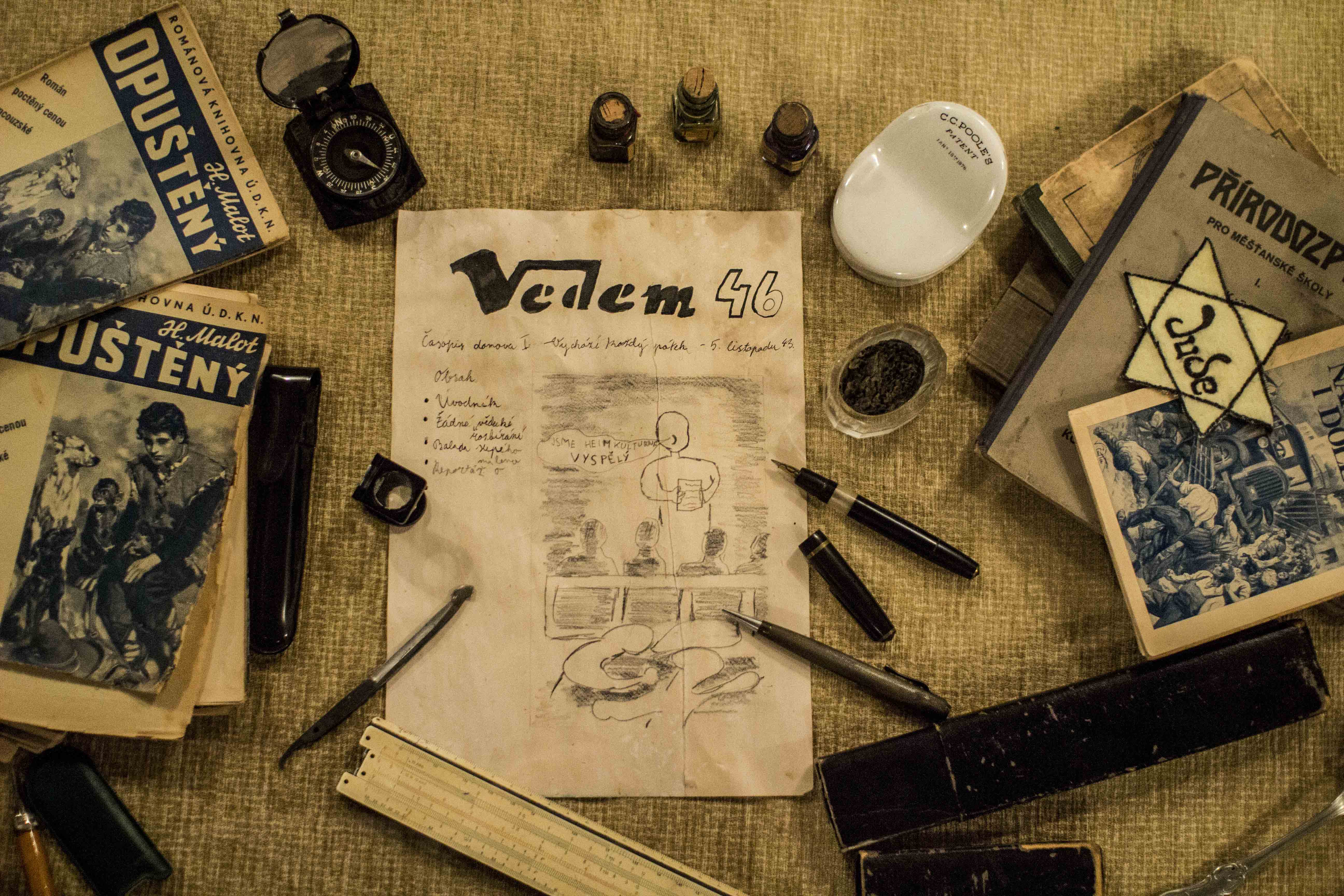
Magazine Vedem

Eisinger fostered their love of literature and founded a weekly magazine called Vedem, written and drawn nearly exclusively by the youth of Theresienstadt. He became the inspiration for the authors of Vedem, encouraging them to express themselves creatively and to describe both what they witnessed and what were their hopes for the future. Tomas Brod: "Each class in the school was something of a miniature home, and each was a peculiar unit of its own, since the educators brought their charges, the children, up in the spirit of their own political persuasion. Eisinger was a communist, so he educated children in socialist and communist ideas. Class 7 had a Zionist educator, who taught the children in the spirit of Zionism and taught them Hebrew songs." Most probably under Eisinger's influence, the boys adopted a rocket ship, inspired by Jules Verne, flying past a book to a star, as the symbol of their barracks and of their magazine. His main discoveries were Petr Ginz as editor-in-chief and the talented poet Hanuš Hachenburg. He encouraged them to even use a humorous tone in order to make it easier to secure their own mental survival within a very hostile environment.

Vedem also contains over 40 contributions from Eisinger himself. He wrote about culture, politics and pedagogical themes, but he also translated poetry, especially Russian. Several survivors of the Shoah praised Eisinger's educational activities in Theresienstadt and his contribution to the secret teaching of the youth in the ghetto.

On 28 September 1944 he was deported with Transport Ek to Auschwitz concentration camp. His transport number was 422 of 2,500. From there he was deported to a working command post in Buchenwald concentration camp. According to the memories of fellow prisoners, he was shot by the SS on the death march in Thuringia in January 1945.

== Family ==
His brother Bruno and his sister Martha, her husband Erich Heský (born on 27 September 1907) and their son Hagibor (born 1936) were all killed in Auschwitz in 1943. Both his parents were murdered in 1944 in Auschwitz.

The fate of his siblings Therese and Viktor Eisinger is unknown.
