= Miroslav Kárný =

Miroslav Kárný

Miroslav Kárný (9 September 1919 – 9 May 2001) was a Czech historian and journalist.

== Early life and education ==
Kárný was born in Prague, Czechoslovakia, into an assimilated Jewish family. His mother ran a shop selling candy and haberdashery and his father was a tradesman. After graduating from the gymnasium, Kárný studied history and Czech language at the Charles University in Prague from 1937 to 1939. During this time, he joined the students' communist organisation Kostufra.

== Deportation and late life ==
Because he was Jewish, Kárný was sent on 24 November 1941 to the Theresienstadt Ghetto, where he met his future wife, Margita Krausová (1923–1998). Both became active in the communist resistance group in Theresienstadt and collaborated with Josef Taussig, Bruno Zwicker, Valtr Eisinger, Josef Stiassny and Friedl Dicker-Brandeis. In September 1944, they were deported to the Auschwitz concentration camp in occupied Poland. From there, Kárný was deported for slave labour to the Kaufering concentration camp in Germany, a subcamp of Dachau.

After the war, he became a journalist, then a freelance historian, specializing in the Holocaust and German fascism. He was expelled from the Communist Party of Czechoslovakia (KSČ) due to condemnation of his brother Jiří in the anti-Semitic Slánský trial (1952), (Note: Jiří Kárný was then working as a manager, closely with Ludvík Frejka, one of the main defendants. Frejka was hanged; Jiří received a long sentence.) and for a second time in 1969, after the Warsaw Pact invasion of Czechoslovakia. He retired in 1973.

Kárný died on 9 May 2001 in Prague, aged 81. He is buried at the Vinohrady Cemetery in Prague.

== Publications ==
Books

- With Götz Aly and Susanne Heim: Sozialpolitik und Judenvernichtung. Gibt es eine Ökonomie der „Endlösung“?, Rotbuch 1987, ISBN 3-88022-954-6
- With Jaroslava Milotová and Margita Kárná: Deutsche Politik im „Protektorat Böhmen und Mähren“ unter Reinhard Heydrich 1941–1942. Eine Dokumentation. Metropol 1997, ISBN 3-926893-44-3
- Theresienstädter Gedenkbuch – die Opfer der Judentransporte aus Deutschland nach Theresienstadt 1942 – 1945. Institut Theresienstädter Initiative. Edited by Miroslav Kárný in Kollaboration with Alexander Blodigová. Berlin, Metropol-Verlag 2000 ISBN 80-200-0793-8. Edition Theresienstädter Initiative

Articles

- "Zur Typologie des Theresienstädter Konzentrationslagers". In: Judaica Bohemiae. XVII Jg., Nr. 1, 1981, 3–14.
- "Zur Statistik der jüdischen Bevölkerung im sog. Protektorat". In: Judaica Bohemiae. Nr. 2, Bd. XXII, 1986, 9–19.
- "Das Schicksal der Theresienstädter Osttransporte im Sommer und Herbst 1942". In: Judaica Bohemiae. Nr. 2, Bd. XXIV, 1988, 83–97.
- "Deutsche Juden in Theresienstadt". In: Theresienstädter Studien und Dokumente. 1994, 36–53.
- "'Heydrichiaden'. Widerstand und Terror im Protektorat Böhmen und Mähren". In: Loukia Droulia, Hagen Fleischer (Hrsg.): Von Lidice bis Kalavryta. Widerstand und Besatzungsterror. Studien zur Repressalienpraxis im Zweiten Weltkrieg. (Nationalsozialistische Besatzungspolitik in Europa 1939–1945, Band 8). Berlin 1999, ISBN 3-932482-10-7.
- "Sieben Monate in Kaufering". In: Theresienstädter Studien und Dokumente. 2002, 13–24.
