= Sidney Taussig =

Sidney Zdeněk Taussig
- Born: 17 October 1929; Prague, Czechoslovakia
- Died: 13 December 2023 (aged 94); Greenacres, Florida, United States
- Spouse: Marion

Sidney Zdeněk Taussig (17 October 1929 – 13 December 2023) was a Holocaust survivor who lived in the Theresienstadt Ghetto during World War II. He is known for his role in the preservation of the magazine Vedem, to which he contributed between 1942 and 1944.

He died on 13 December 2023 in Florida, United States.
