= Cultural life of Theresienstadt Ghetto =

Karel Ančerl conducts the Theresienstadt orchestra

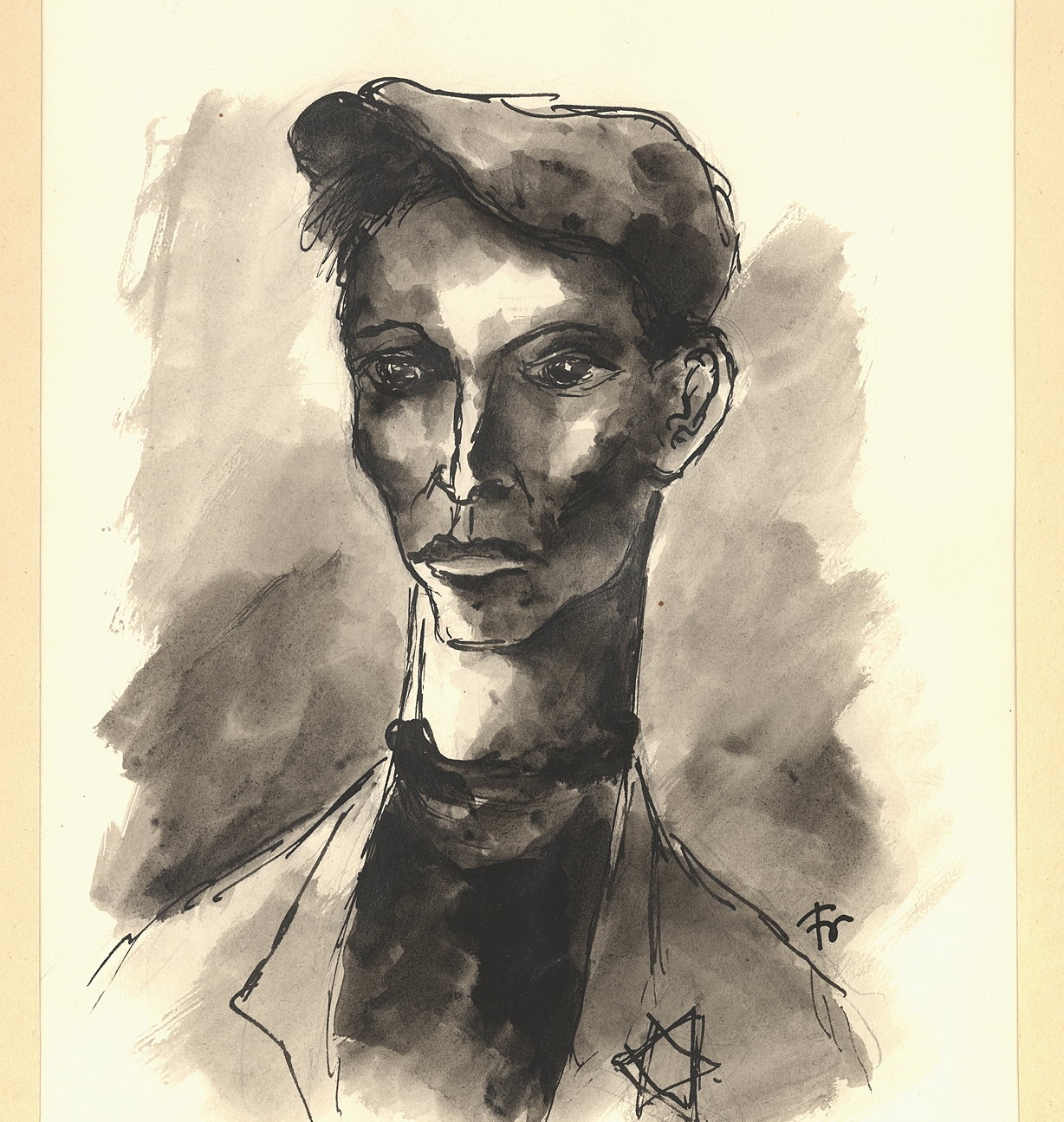
Pen and ink drawing of a jewish worker in Theresienstadt assigned to Bedřich Fritta, Theresienstadt, 1942. In the collection of the Jewish Museum of Switzerland.

Theresienstadt was originally designated as a model community for middle-class Jews from Germany, Czechoslovakia, and Austria. Many educated Jews were inmates of Theresienstadt. In a propaganda effort designed to fool the western allies, the Nazis publicised the camp for its rich cultural life. In reality, according to Holocaust survivor, Friedrich Schlaefrig, "during the early period there were no [musical] instruments whatsoever, and the cultural life came to develop itself only ... when the whole management of Theresienstadt was steered into an organized course."

The community in Theresienstadt tried to ensure that all the children who passed through the camp continued with their education. The Nazis required all camp children over a certain age to work, but accepted working on stage as employment. The prisoners achieved the children's education under the guise of work or cultural activity. Daily classes and sports activities were held. The community published a magazine, Vedem. The history of the magazine was studied and narrated by the Italian writer Matteo Corradini in his book La repubblica delle farfalle (The Republic of the Butterflies). Sir Ben Kingsley read that novel, speaking on 27 January 2015 during the ceremony held at Theresienstadt to mark International Holocaust Memorial Day.

Ilse Weber, a noted Czech Jewish poet, writer and musician for children, was held in the camp from February 1942, and worked as a night nurse in the camp's children's infirmary. She volunteered to join a transport of children to Auschwitz in November 1944, where she, her son Tommy, and all the children with her were murdered in the gas chambers immediately on arrival.

Conductor Rafael Schächter was among those held at the camp, and he formed an adult chorus. He directed it in a performance of the massive and complex Requiem by Giuseppe Verdi. Schächter conducted 15 more performances of the work before he was deported to Auschwitz-Birkenau.

Violinist Julius Stwertka, a former leading member of the Boston Symphony Orchestra and co-leader of the Vienna Philharmonic, was murdered in the camp on 17 December 1942.

Pianist Alice Herz-Sommer (held with her son, Raphael Sommer) performed 100 concerts while imprisoned at Theresienstadt. She and Edith Steiner-Kraus, her friend and colleague, both survived the camp, emigrated to Israel after the war, and became professors of music, Herz-Sommer at the Jerusalem Academy of Music, and Steiner-Kraus at the Tel Aviv Academy of Music (now the Buchmann-Mehta School of Music).

Martin Roman and Coco Schumann were part of the jazz band Ghetto Swingers. Artist and art teacher Friedl Dicker-Brandeis created drawing classes for children in the ghetto, among whom were Hana Brady ("Hana's suitcase"). They produced more than 4,000 drawings, which she hid in two suitcases before she was deported to Auschwitz in the final liquidation. The collection was preserved from destruction, and was discovered a decade later. Most of these drawings can now be seen at the Jewish Museum in Prague, whose archive of the Holocaust section administers the Terezín Archive Collection. Others are on display at Yad Vashem in Jerusalem. The children of the camp also wrote stories and poems. Some were preserved and later published in a collection called I Never Saw Another Butterfly, its title taken from a poem by young Jewish Czech poet Pavel Friedmann. He had arrived at Terezín on 26 April 1942 and was later murdered at Auschwitz.

Painter Malva Schalek (Malvina Schalkova) was deported to Theresienstadt in February 1942. She produced more than 100 drawings and watercolours portraying life in the camp. On 18 May 1944, due to her refusal to paint the portrait of a collaborationist doctor, she was deported to Auschwitz, where she was murdered.

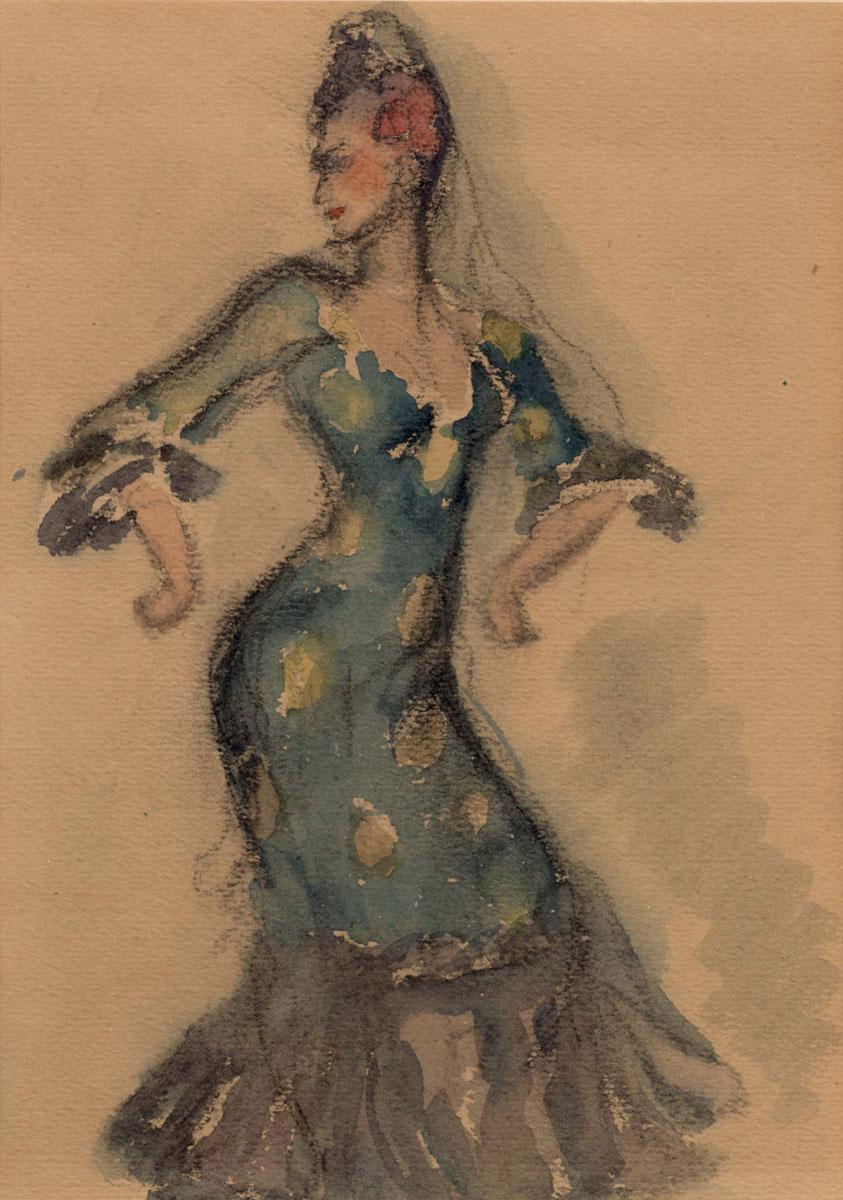
Painting The Last Flamenco by Charlotta Burešová, depicting Catharina Brücker in Theresienstadt

Painter Charlotta Burešová was deported to Theresienstadt in July 1942. She was forced to work at the Lautscher Werkstätte producing postcards, greeting cards and copies of works painted by the Old Masters, particularly by Peter Paul Rubens and Rembrandt. These were sold outside of the ghetto by the Nazis, who kept the proceeds. She also produced watercolour portrait paintings recording children, dancers, musicians and flowers in the ghetto, in contrast to the conditions and suffering around her. They were hidden until after the end of World War II. Burešová was made to paint a portrait of Karl Rahm, the Schutzstaffel (SS) commandant of the ghetto, and due to this she was excluded from transport to Auschwitz concentration camp in 1944 and survived the war.

Artist and architect Norbert Troller produced drawings and watercolours of life inside Theresienstadt, to be smuggled to the outside world. When the Gestapo found out, he was arrested and deported to Auschwitz, where he was liberated by the Russians in 1945. His memoirs and two dozen of his artworks were published in 1991.

Composer Viktor Ullmann was interned in September 1942, and murdered in Auschwitz in October 1944. He composed some twenty works at Theresienstadt, including the one-act opera Der Kaiser von Atlantis (The Emperor of Atlantis or The Refusal of Death). It was planned for performance at the camp, but the Nazis withdrew permission when it was in rehearsal, probably because the authorities perceived its allegorical intent. The opera was first performed in 1975, and shown in full on BBC television in Britain. It continues to be performed.

Music composed by inmates is featured in Terezín: The Music 1941–44, a two-CD set released in 1991. The collection features music composed mostly in 1943 and 1944 by Pavel Haas, Gideon Klein, Hans Krása, and Viktor Ullmann while interned at Theresienstadt. Haas, Krása, and Ullmann were murdered in Auschwitz concentration camp in 1944, and Klein was murdered in Fürstengrube in 1945.

In 2007, the album Terezín – Theresienstadt of music composed at Theresienstadt was released by the Swedish singer Anne Sofie von Otter, assisted by baritone Christian Gerhaher, pianists, and chamber musicians. In 2008, Bridge Records released a recital by Austrian baritone Wolfgang Holzmair and American pianist Russell Ryan that drew on a different selection of songs.

== Culture as Survival ==
Scholars have interpreted acts of cultural expression through theater, music, and art in Theresienstadt as a strategy for survival by those deported there. The ghetto became the site of a wide variety of works of art using different artistic mediums, from lectures to drawings, and devoted to a variety of themes. At first, cultural activities were suppressed by the Nazis, but when the function of the ghetto as a model became clearer in 1942, these activities were deemed acceptable. The Nazis decided that Theresienstadt could function uniquely as a place to deport members of Europe’s cultural elite. At this time the Freizeitgestaltung (Association of Free Time Activities) was established, and cultural activities were allowed by the Nazis. However, instruments had previously been smuggled into Theresienstadt since 1941, and many artists considered them to be among their most basic needs. Children in the ghetto expressed themselves and their reactions to their circumstances through drawings in the lessons permitted by the Nazis. With these outlets, the people attempted to create a sense of hope within the ghetto.

In Theresienstadt, cultural production thrived much more than in the Protectorate. Art in the ghetto underwent drastic development as it allowed for depiction and representation of true life in Theresienstadt. The artwork provided the people with an artistic outlet through which they could express their feelings of defiance. Despite constant deportations of inmates to the East, the ghetto inhabitants remained determined to continue performing and creating. Places in casts often needed to be reassigned as participants were deported. The people remained strong willed in their persistence to create, as it helped them remain hopeful and live a more humane existence. Rafael Schachter was one of the pioneering members of cultural activity in Theresienstadt. In the early days of Theresienstadt’s cultural activity, Schachter included a satirical sketch in his first performance. Later in his time in Theresienstadt, Schachter put together a rendition of Verdi’s Requiem. In this version of Requiem, Schachter changed the ending notes to communicate a resistance signal. Adolf Eichmann and other important Nazi leaders were in the audience for a performance of Schachter’s Requiem, and Eichmann specifically enjoyed this version of the piece. The Nazis didn't understand the underlying meanings of the change to Requiem or many other works performed in the ghetto.

On September 23, 1943, the first performance of the children’s show Brundibar appeared in Theresienstadt. The show was performed fifty five times, and was the most successful show of all of the productions ever performed in the ghetto. Cast members were replaced as they were deported, but the show's main acts remained the same throughout the duration of the performances. Brundibar’s original composer Hans Krasa composed a new score for the show in Theresienstadt as the original score had been lost, and the show was put together by Rudolf Freudenfeld under the supervision and tutelage of Rafael Schachter. For the Theresienstadt performances of the show, poet Emil A. Saudek changed the ending lines from the original version to emphasize a political meaning behind the show. It was clear to the audience that the show’s main antagonist represented Hitler, but the Nazis themselves did not realize the hidden meaning in Brundibar, and even had the show presented during a visit by the Red Cross. Brundibar was the top musical performance ever performed at Theresienstadt.

Emperor of Atlantis was another opera produced in Theresienstadt. The opera was created by Peter Kien and Viktor Ullmann, who created the opera in the form of a legend so that they could include hidden meaning that would be missed by the Nazis. Ullman strategically used music to include undertones with resistance implications, including artistic manipulation of the Deutschlandlied, and a secondary version of sheet music, with less direct implications than the version that was actually rehearsed, was handed over to the Nazi. Ultimately, Emperor of Atlantis was never performed at Theresienstadt, although scholars differ on their reasoning as to why the opera never reached performance. The show may have ended before being performed because the Nazis in control of the ghetto saw the allegorical connection to Hitler and Nazi Germany in the opera’s plot line. Alternatively, some scholars say the show never reached performance because of deportation to Auschwitz.

Scholars’ views vary on Nazi reaction to the production of Theresienstadt’s cultural works. Some say the Nazis remained indifferent to the work that was composed and sung inside the ghetto. Others say that the Nazis encouraged the artistic production, as the SS thought that nothing from Theresienstadt would ever reach outside of the ghetto.

== Bibliography ==
- Karas, Joza (1985). Music in Terezín 1941-1945 (1st ed.). New York: Beaufort Books. ISBN 0825302870. OCLC 11468415.
- Kramer, Aaron (1998). "Creative Defiance in a Death-Camp". Journal of Humanistic Psychology. 38 (1): 12–24. doi:10.1177/00221678980381003.
- Redlich, Gonda (1992). Friedman, Saul S. (ed.). The Terezin Diary of Gonda Redlich. Trans. Laurence Kutler, foreword by Nora Levin. University Press of Kentucky. ISBN 0-8131-1804-2.
- Rovit, Rebecca; Goldfarb, Alvin (1999). Theatrical performance during the Holocaust : texts, documents, memoirs. Baltimore: Johns Hopkins University Press. ISBN 0801861675. OCLC 41173837.
- Steiner, Frantisek (2017). Fußball unterm gelben Stern: Die Liga im Ghetto Theresienstadt 1943–44 (in German). Brill Schöningh. ISBN 978-3-657-78626-8.
