= Vedem =

Magazine published in the Terezín ghetto

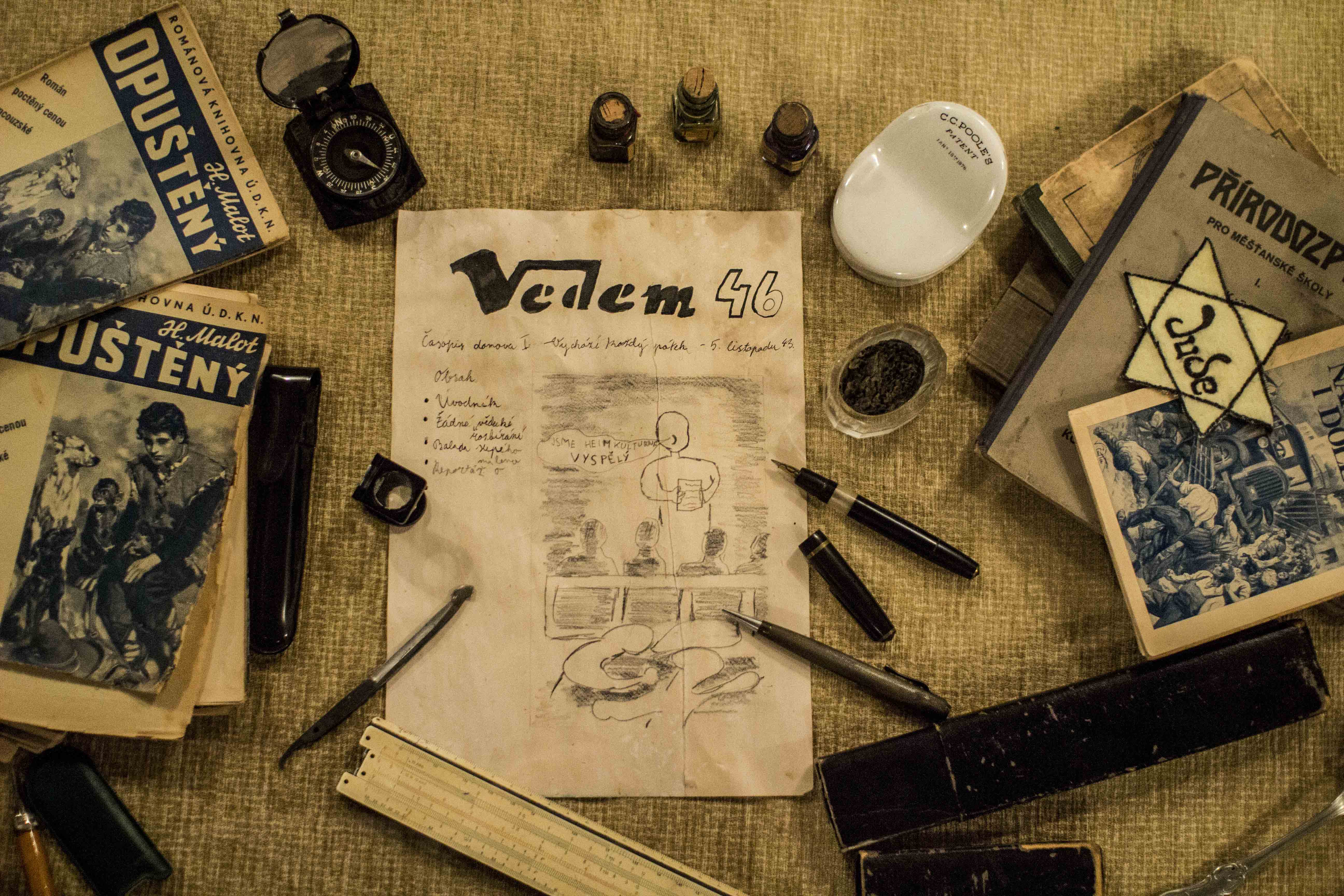
Vedem magazine

Vedem (We are leading) was a Czech-language literary magazine that existed from 1942 to 1944 in the Theresienstadt Ghetto in the ghetto of Terezín during the Holocaust. It was hand-produced by a group of teenaged boys, among them editor-in-chief Petr Ginz and Hanuš Hachenburg. Altogether, about 800 pages of Vedem survived World War II.

== History of the magazine ==
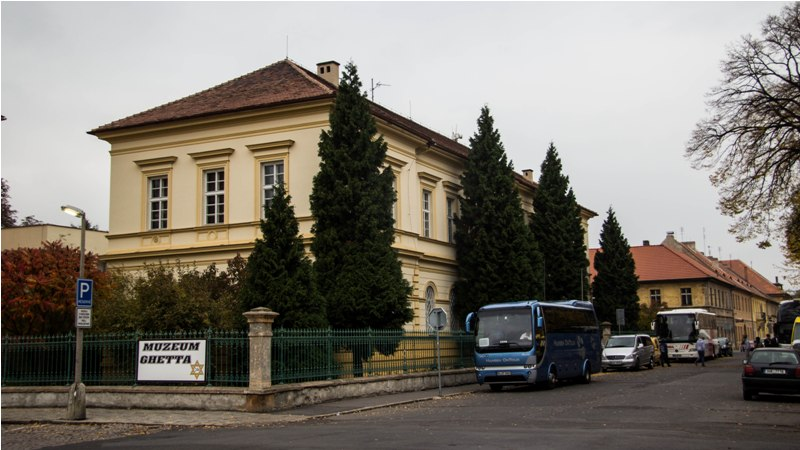
Home L417, now houses the Ghetto Museum

The Theresienstadt Ghetto is known for its rich cultural life. Several boys' houses had their magazines, and Vedem is the best known among them. The magazine was written, edited, and illustrated entirely by young boys, aged twelve to fifteen, who lived in Home L417 (Heim L417, also "Boys' Home 1", a former school building). The boys referred to the house as the Republic of Shkid. The content of Vedem included poems, essays, jokes, dialogues, literary reviews, stories, and drawings. The issues were then copied manually and read around the house. For some time, it was also posted on the house bulletin board; however, it was decided to discontinue this practice because it was deemed dangerous in case of SS inspections.

The inspiration for the authors of Vedem was their teacher, twenty-eight-year-old "Professor" Valtr Eisinger, who was appointed to supervise the boys in that house. He fostered their love of literature and encouraged them to express themselves creatively, to describe both what they witnessed (often in a humorous tone) and their hopes for the future. It was probably under his influence that the boys adopted a rocket ship, inspired by Jules Verne, flying past a book to a star, as the symbol of their house and their magazine.

Eisinger himself never contributed directly to Vedem, but did add the occasional editorial or translation from Russian. The work itself was done by the boys, who wandered around Terezin looking for themes. Each boy took a nickname to sign their articles. This might have been obscure initials, a pseudonym, or some personal quirk like "Dummy" or "Bolshevik." Sometimes, the nicknames would change. For instance, one prolific contributor, Jiří Grünbaum, called himself "Medic Šnajer," "Socialist Šnajer," or just "Šnajer," depending on his mood. Hanuš Hachenburg contributed several poems and was an avid collaborator. At some point in 1943, ten of the most prolific contributors began to refer to themselves as the "Academy." Today, many of the contributors can only be identified by their nicknames, and their true identities are unknown.

The boys smuggled in art supplies to work on the magazine. They found an abandoned typewriter and used it to create the first 30 issues. The next 53 issues were made by hand after the typewriter ran out of ink. A boy served as lookout as the rest worked on the wooden table in the middle of the bunkroom, or while sitting on their bunks. If a guard approached, he would give a secret signal and the others would hide their work.

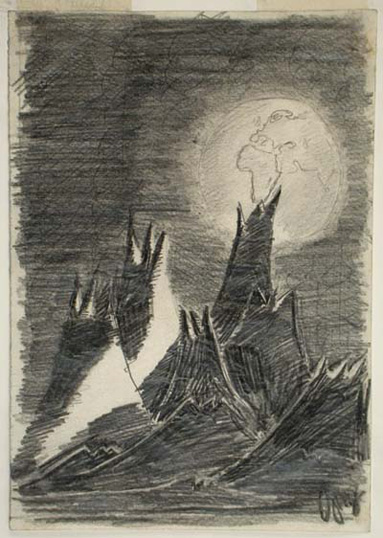
"Moon Landscape" ("Měsíční krajina"), by Petr Ginz, taken to space

One of the outstanding contributors to Vedem was "nz," or Petr Ginz. At 14, he was editor-in-chief of the magazine. At 16, Ginz was deported to Auschwitz, where he was gassed. A copy of his drawing "Moon Landscape" was taken by Israeli astronaut Ilan Ramon onto the Space Shuttle Columbia, which disintegrated upon the reentry. In 2018 a copy of the drawing was taken to the space again, to the International Space Station, by Andrew J. Feustel.

The boys tried as much as possible to create a real magazine, even jokingly adding a price on the cover. The material included poetry, adventure stories, essays, and book reviews, as well as popular features such as the "Quote of the Week," chosen from silly things the boys said. For instance, "Medic Šnajer" was once quoted as saying, "I am afraid to speak. I might say something stupid." "Embryo" was quoted as saying, "Football is the best game, right after Monopoly."

In one edition, a review of Uncle Tom's Cabin compares the fate of African American slaves with that of the Jews in Terezín, noting that until the deportations began, African-Americans had it worse because their families were torn apart. Afterward, the suffering of the two groups became approximately equivalent. In the popular feature "Rambles through Terezín", Petr Ginz visits various institutions throughout the Ghetto and interviews people there. His writing includes visits to the bakery, the maternity hospital, the fire station, and a very chilling visit to the crematorium.

== Preservation and publication ==
By 1944, most of the inhabitants of Home L417 alongside most of other inhabitants of the Ghetto had been deported to the East. Most of them perished in gas chambers of Auschwitz, and no more issues of Vedem were produced. Of the 92 boys who participated in the effort to produce Vedem, only fifteen survived. One of them, Sidney Zdeněk Taussig, remained in Terezín until its liberation in May 1945. He had hidden about 800 pages of the magazine in the blacksmith shop where his father had worked, and brought them to Prague after he was liberated.

After the war, efforts to publish Vedem were thwarted under the communist regime of Czechoslovakia, but excerpts were smuggled to Paris, where they were printed in the Czech émigré magazine Svĕdectví. A type-written samizdat version was published in Czechoslovakia that same year and was re-released in the 1980s. This version was exhibited in the Frankfurt Book Fair in 1990.

Selections from Vedem, illustrated by art that appeared in the magazine, as well as with the drawings by other children in Terezín, were published with an introduction by Václav Havel in 1995, translated in English as We Are Children Just the Same: Vedem, the Secret Magazine of the Boys of Terezín. (Note: Czech title: Je mojí vlastí hradba ghett? : Básně, próza a kresby terezínských dětí, also translated in German as Ist meine Heimat der Ghettowall? - Gedichte, Prosa und Zeichnungen der Kinder von Theresienstadt, both read "Is my home the ghetto wall? - Poems, prose and drawings by the children of Theresienstadt.") The editors of this selection included Kurt Jiři Kotouč and Zdenĕk Ornest, two of the original contributors from Terezín. The book is the winner of the 1995 National Jewish Book Award by the Jewish Book Council.

A feature documentary called The Boys of Terezin was created in 2011. It details the creation of Vedem and the life of the boys living in the Terezin ghetto.

The Vedem Foundation, founded in 2016, is a museum collection that honors the original Vedem magazine.They produce exhibits, films, and more.
