= Josef Taussig =

Czech journalist (1914–1945)

Josef (Pepek) Taussig (1 December 1914, Hlinsko – 10 March 1945, Flossenbürg concentration camp) was a Czech journalist.

Taussig was a journalist with the youth magazine "Hej rup".

On 5 December 1942, he was relocated with his parents, Otto Taussig (1875-1944) and Frederike, née Federer (1886-1944) and at least five other relatives from his home town, Hlinsko, via Pardubice, to Theresienstadt concentration camp (transport Cf). In Theresienstadt, he lectured; produced plays and cabarets. He was transported again on 28 October 1944 (with his parents and one other relative) to Auschwitz concentration camp on the last train from Theresienstadt (transport Ev); and finally in January 1945 he survived a death march to Flossenbürg, where he died on 10 March 1945, five weeks before the U.S. Army's 90th Infantry Division freed the camp on April 23, 1945.

His elder brother, František (Franta) Taussig (1909-1941), editor of the Communist newspaper ‘Pravo’ in Brno and a member of the first illegal central committee, was executed by the Gestapo on 29 September 1941 in a former cavalry barracks near Ruzne airport with fellow committee members Dr. Jan Frank and Otto Synek. Frantisek was the first husband of Jarmila Taussigová-Potůčková (1914-2011), also an active Communist, who survived deportation to Ravensbrück concentration camp and, after the war, imprisonment by the Communists following the Slánský show trials.
