= Rafael Schächter =

Czech musician

- Born: May 25, 1905; Brăila, Romanian Old Kingdom
- Died: 1945 (aged 39–40); Gau Upper Silesia, Nazi Germany
- Era: 20th century

Rafael Schächter (born 25 May 1905, died on the death march during the evacuation of Auschwitz in 1945), was a Czechoslovak composer, pianist and conductor of Jewish origin, organizer of cultural life in Terezín concentration camp.

== Life ==
He came from Romanian town Brăila, but after World War I he came to Brno, where he studied piano under Vilém Kurz. He moved to Prague with Kurz and started to study piano at master school with Karel Hoffmeister, and composition and conducting at Prague Conservatory. After he finished his studies, he was engaged (in 1934) to avant-garde theatre Déčko by E. F. Burian. In 1937 he established his own ensemble—Komorní opera, where he performed lesser-known chamber and also baroque music.

After the German occupation of Czechoslovakia in 1939, the Nazi administration began a program of mass incarceration, deportation, and genocide of the 100,000+ Jewish people there, including the establishment of the Theresienstadt ghetto and concentration camp in the Czech town of Terezín. Schächter was sent to Terezín on 30 November 1941 in Transport H, serial number 128. Here he set up a smuggled piano in the basement of the men's barracks housing. Without the constant oversight of Nazi soldiers within the camp, Schächter was able to assemble a male choir to keep morale high. He also managed to slip by the barred gates of the men's section to the woman's barracks to assemble a female choir there as well. When the genders were reintegrated by the Nazis, Schächter's established choir was able to gain clemency from the camp director. With his choir, which numbered well in excess of 200 members, he was able to create, often from a single score, productions of famous operas and works of classical music.

The first opera performed in Terezín was The Bartered Bride by Bedřich Smetana. Schächter rehearsed the performance only with piano and improvised choir and solos, but it was subjected to great acclaim. The initial performance took place on 25 November 1942 without permission from the Freizeitgestaltung (Administration of Free Time Activities), but the concert opera was so well received that it was shown to administration and approved for an official premiere on 28 November 1942. The performance was reprised many times. Schächter also staged performances of Smetana's opera The Kiss, Mozart's The Marriage of Figaro and The Magic Flute, and Pergolesi's La Serva Padrona.

Schächter also led approximately sixteen performances of Verdi's Requiem and reportedly taught the 150 member choir their parts by rote. It is estimated that the first performance occurred in January 1942, with a chorus of 150 and a piano for accompaniment. Over the following months, even as his choir shrank, the Requiem was performed approximately 15 additional times. The final performance, however, served as propaganda as Schächter was forced to perform excerpts of the oratorio before visiting members of the International Red Cross and Schutzstaffel (S.S.).

A few months after this final performance, on 16 October 1944, under transport 943, Schächter was loaded into a rail road cattle car with approximately 1,000 other prisoners. They were transported during a 3-day journey to the infamous Auschwitz camp. According to a survivor's account, he later went to three more death camps and died in the last.

== Bibliography ==
- Kuna, Milan: Hudba vzdoru a naděje. Terezín 1941-1945. Praha: Editio Bärenreiter, 2000. H 7822 (in Czech)
- Šormová, Eva: Divadlo v Terezíně 1941/1945. Památník Terezín, 1973. (in Czech)
- Bor, Josef (1964). Terezínské rekviem (in Czech). Prague: Československý spisovatel. - Czech novel about Rafael Schächter
