= Petr Ginz =

Czech child victim of the Holocaust (1928–1944)

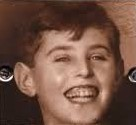
- Ginz c. 1939
- Born: 1 February 1928; Prague, Czechoslovakia
- Died: 28 September 1944 (aged 16); Auschwitz-Birkenau, German-occupied Poland
- Cause of death: Gassed to death
- Resting place: Auschwitz concentration camp, Oświęcim, Poland
- Occupations: Diarist, writer
- Known for: Paintings and writings

Petr Ginz (1 February 1928 – 28 September 1944) was a Czechoslovak boy of partial Jewish background who was deported to the Theresienstadt Ghetto (known as Terezín, in Czech) during the Holocaust. He was murdered at the age of sixteen when he was transferred to Auschwitz concentration camp and gassed to death upon arrival. His diary was published after his death.

== Life ==
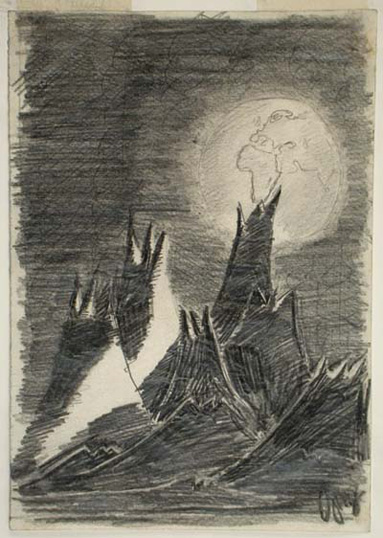
Earth seen from the Moon

Ginz was the son of Otto Ginz, the manager of the export department of a Prague textile company and a notable Esperantist, and Marie Ginz (née Dolanská). Ginz's father was Jewish, while his mother was not. His parents met at an Esperantist congress. His mother was from Hradec Králové, where her father was a village teacher. Ginz received frequent visits from his relatives, especially during Christmas holidays. Ginz was a very intelligent boy. Between the ages of 8 and 14 he wrote four novels: From Prague to China, The Wizard from Altay Mountains, Around the World in One Second and A Visit from Prehistory — the only surviving novel. The novels, including Návštěva z pravěku (English: Visit from Prehistory), were written in the style of Jules Verne and illustrated with his own paintings. He was interested in the sciences and yearned for knowledge. Due to his parents' interest in Esperanto, that language was one of Petr's native languages (the other being Czech).

According to the anti-Jewish laws of the Third Reich, children from mixed marriages were to be deported to a concentration camp at the age of 14. Young Ginz was transported to the Theresienstadt concentration camp in October 1942. His efforts in the sciences and thirst for knowledge remained, and he tried to study even in the concentration camp. He often read from a library full of confiscated books to which he had access. He was placed in Domov č.1 (Home No. 1, building L417). He became one of the most significant individuals of the community. He established and prepared for publication the periodical magazine Vedem, which means "We Lead". He also wrote an Esperanto–Czech dictionary as well as several other short novels that have since been lost. One such piece of writing is called "Rambles through Theresienstadt" in which he interviews people and comments on people, buildings, and even the crematorium.

The breadth of his interests, abilities, and character are shown by his remaining writings and by the testimonials of friends who survived. He was interested in literature, history, paintings, geography, sociology, and the technical fields. The magazine Vedem was published every Friday for two years.

Petr was assigned to one of the last transports to Auschwitz concentration camp from Terezín. He was murdered in the gas chambers in 1944. His diary has been published in English under the name: The Diary of Petr Ginz 1941–1942.

== Vedem ==
The magazine was founded shortly after his arrival at Terezín in 1942. Besides Ginz, several other boys from the Domov č.1. also contributed. Petr Ginz became a chief editor and he contributed under the code name nz or Akademie (Academy). One of his closest collaborators was Hanuš Hachenburg who wrote many poems. Ginz gave most of his writings and paintings to his sister before his transport, so a majority have survived to today. His sister was also deported to Terezín in 1944, but she survived.

== Diary ==
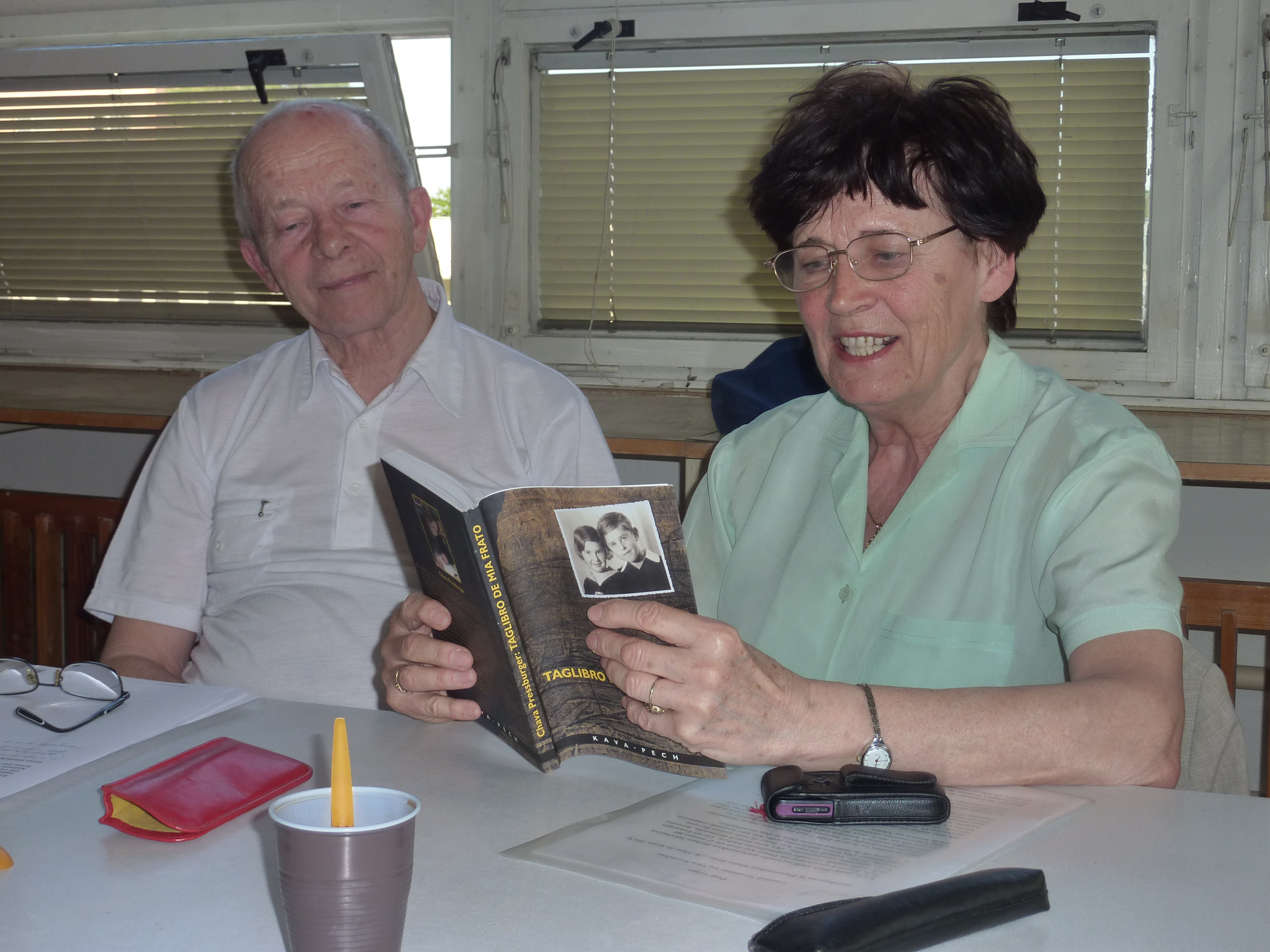
Věra and Vlastimil Novobilský reading aloud from their Esperanto translation of Petr Ginz's diary for members of the Esperanto club in Brno (2013)

Before his transport, Ginz wrote a diary between 1941 and 1942 about his life. This diary, written in a matter-of-fact way, has been compared to that of Anne Frank. This diary was lost but found and published by his sister Eva (later Chava Pressburger) as Diary of My Brother. It was published in Spanish, Catalan, and Esperanto, as well as the original Czech, and in English in April 2007 as The Diary of Petr Ginz 1941–1942. A review appeared in an issue of The New York Times dated Tuesday 10 April 2007.

== Drawing ==
Israeli astronaut Ilan Ramon, whose mother and grandmother were survivors of Auschwitz, was asked by S. Isaac Mekel, director of development at the American Society for Yad Vashem, to take an item from Yad Vashem onto the American Space Shuttle Columbia. Ramon carried with him a copy of a drawing by Ginz of the planet Earth as seen from the Moon. The shuttle, while reentering Earth's atmosphere, broke apart on 1 February 2003, destroying the copy of Ginz's drawing on what would have been his 75th birthday. In 2018, 15 years after the Space Shuttle Columbia disaster, another copy was given by Yad Vashem to Ilan's widow, Rona, to give to astronaut Andrew Feustel. Feustel carried it to space during Expedition 56 in memory of Ginz and Ramon. Feustel's video message commemorating Holocaust Remembrance Day (Yom HaShoah) 2018/5778 featured the astronaut displaying Ginz's depiction of a view of Earth from the Moon. On February 1, 2020, Feustel gifted one of the copies of “Moon Landscape” brought to space to the Czech Center Museum Houston.

== Legacy ==
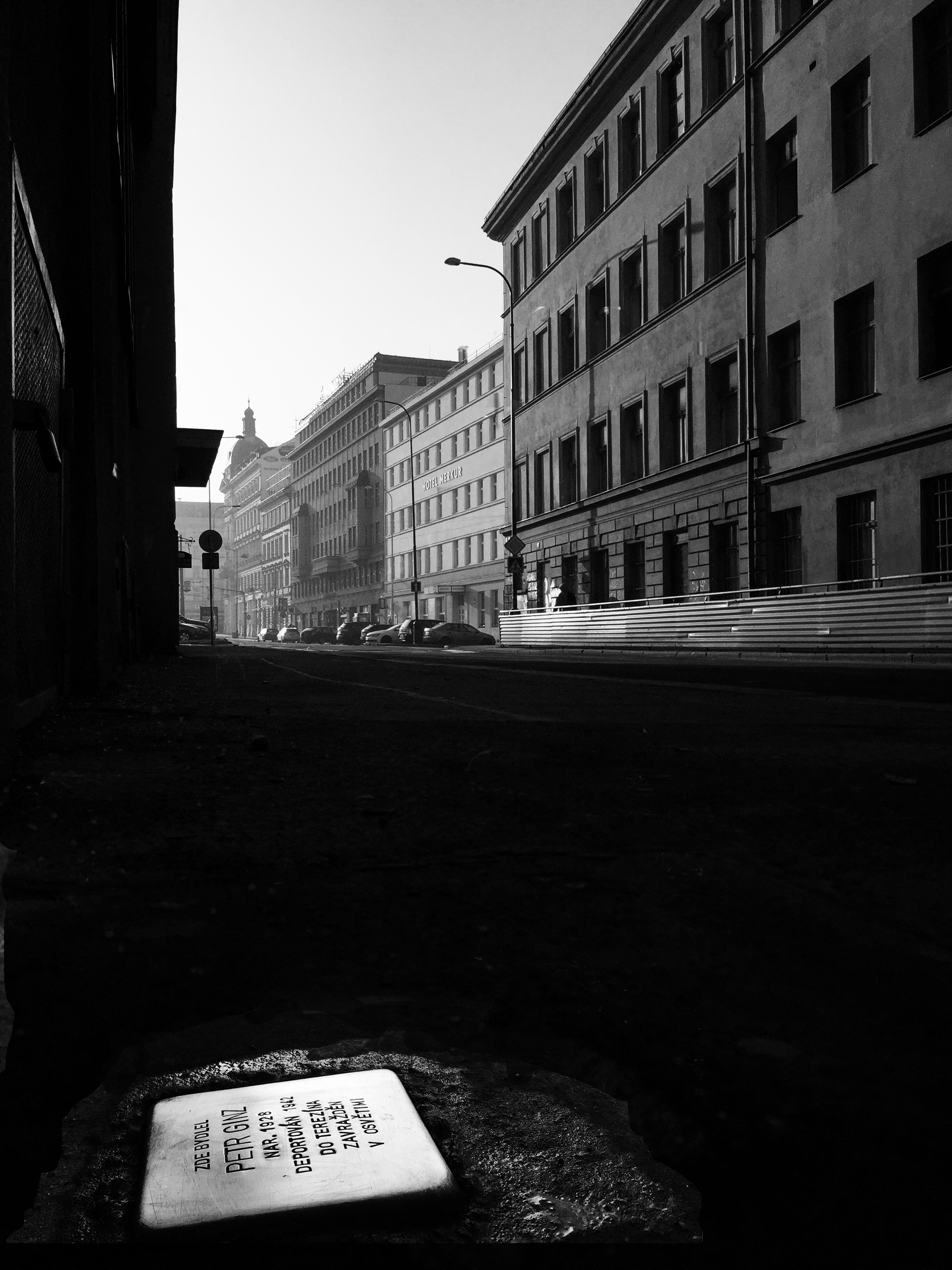
Stolperstein for Petr Ginz in front of Stárkova 1745/4 in Prague

- The asteroid 50413 Petrginz was named in his honour.
- In 2005 the Czech Post issued a 31 KČ stamp with the Moon drawing and a portrait in remembrance of Petr Ginz.
- A Stolperstein by German artist Gunter Demnig was installed in his honor in Prague.
- He was the subject of the play The Diary of Petr Ginz performed at the Prague Fringe Festival in 2008.
- His life was commemorated in a 2012 documentary film, The Last Flight of Petr Ginz, directed by Sandra Dickson and Churchill Roberts.
- Norwegian progressive rock group Gazpacho included a song inspired by Petr Ginz on their 2014 album Demon.
- His story is commemorated in a song, "For Petr and Ilan", on the album Does the Land Remember Me? (2018) by Ben Fisher.

== See also ==
- List of Holocaust diarists
- List of diarists
- List of posthumous publications of Holocaust victims
