= Norbert Troller =

Czech-American architect

- Born: 1896; Brno, Austria-Hungary
- Died: 1984 (aged 87–88); New York City, U.S.
- Occupation: Architect

Norbert Troller (1896–1984) was a Czech and American architect of Jewish descent. He was also an artist notable for his portrayal on life in the Theresienstadt concentration camp.

== Biography ==
Norbert Troller was born in Brno, Austria-Hungary (now the Czech Republic) in 1896. He served as a soldier in World War I, and was taken prisoner by the Italians but released within a year. After the war, he studied architecture at the Brno Technical University, and as a postgraduate student, in the Academy of Fine Arts in Vienna. He then worked in various architectural firms in Brno, Czechoslovakia, as a draftsman and an architect till he had established his own practice. His projects at that time included single family residences, multifamily residential buildings, industrial buildings, banks, warehouses, department stores, shops and the interiors. His architectural practice ended abruptly with the German occupation of Czechoslovakia in the fall of 1938.

As a Jew, in 1942 he was imprisoned by the Nazis in the Theresienstadt ghetto-concentration camp. The self-government of the ghetto (the Council of Elders of Theresienstadt) hired him as an architect. During this time he produced a series of graphic drawings, showing the horrible conditions of the Jews in the camp, to be smuggled to the outside world. When the Gestapo found it, he was arrested and jailed in 1944. Later that year he was sent to Auschwitz. The Red Army liberated him in 1945. After the war he lived briefly in Kraków, Poland, making a living as a painter, before settling in Prague, and, finally, in his native Brno, where he was able to resume his architectural practice. His first success was to get a commission to build a major department store with offices (the VICHR building) in Brno. Other commissions followed. Yet, being aware of the imminent communist coup, he applied for an American visa in 1945, and emigrated to the US as soon as the coup happened in 1948.

For the next 10 years, Norbert Troller designed Jewish Community Centers for the US, Canada and Colombia, in the Building Bureau of the National Jewish Welfare Board in New York. He produced about 80 designs of those projects. The local architects had realized many of them. Simultaneously, he had developed and implemented planning and construction design standards for the Jewish Community Centers’ buildings. In 1958 he opened his own practice, and was involved in the design of residential houses, interiors of offices, showrooms, retail shops and restaurants in New York City and the metropolitan area.

Many times during his life, Norbert Troller successfully participated in architectural competitions: in Brno, where he held two personal exhibitions in the Art Center, and in America, where he won the First prize and four Third prizes in the Chicago Herald Tribune Better Rooms Competitions, 1949 –1950. In 1981 he had an exhibition of his artwork at the Yeshiva University of New York: 300 Theresienstadt drawings. He also taught in the Peoples University in Brno and in a high school in New York City. He died in 1984.

In his memoirs he presented a detailed account of the Nazi atrocities in the Jewish concentration camps. Seven years after his death one of his memoirs was published in the US.

Surviving nephews and nieces included Georg Stefan Troller, who settled in Paris, Francis Herbert Trent (born Francis Herbert Troller), who settled in London, and Doris Rauch, née Perlhefter (who settled in Washington D. C.).

== Selected projects ==
from 1922

- Single-family residences' interiors. Brno, Czechoslovakia, 1922 – 1939, 1948–1949
- Interior furnishing: lamps, torchers, chandeliers, furniture, and tableware. Brno, Czechoslovakia, 1922–1939
- E. Witman house. Brno, Czechoslovakia
- Dr. Kollman house. Brno, Czechoslovakia, 1947–1949
- Dr. J. Lorek Hunting Lodge. Čeladná, Silesia, 1940
- Restaurant. Moravia, 1940–1941
- Department store. Brno, Czechoslovakia, 1947–1949
- Dr. Miskevics house. Brno, Czechoslovakia, 1947–1949
- Apartments' interiors. New York City, 1950
- Single-family residences in Danbury and Bridgeport, Connecticut, 1953
- Nursery with school, Manhattan, New York, 1954
- Vacation house on the Lake Oscawana, New York, 1961
- Jewish Community Centers:

1948

- Bayonne, New Jersey
- Bogotá, Colombia
- Elmira, New York
- Englewood, New Jersey
- Hamilton, Ontario, Canada
- Nashville, Tennessee
- New Haven, Connecticut
- Sioux City, Iowa

1949

- Duluth, Minnesota
- Jacksonville, Florida
- Memphis, Tennessee
- St. Catharines, Ontario, Canada
- Saginaw, Michigan
- Syracuse, New York
- Toronto, Ontario, Canada #1
- Washington, D.C.
- Youngstown, Ohio

1950

- Akron, Ohio
- Birmingham, Alabama #1
- Bronx, New York
- Charleston, South Carolina
- Evansville, Indiana
- Hazleton, Pennsylvania
- Houston, Texas
- Milwaukee, Wisconsin
- Scranton, Pennsylvania
- Seattle, Washington
- Toledo, Ohio

1951

- Brookline/Boston, Massachusetts
- Los Angeles, California
- Manchester, New Hampshire
- Savannah, Georgia
- Springfield, Massachusetts
- York, Pennsylvania
- Youth Camps

1952

- Atlanta, Georgia
- Camden, New Jersey
- Louisville, Kentucky
- Oakland, California #1
- Philadelphia, Pennsylvania
- Plainfield, New Jersey
- Youth Camps

1953

- Bronx, New York
- Coatesville, Pennsylvania
- Indianapolis, Indiana
- Ottawa, Ontario, Canada
- Passaic, New Jersey
- Washington Heights, New York

1954

- Allentown, Pennsylvania
- Baltimore, Maryland
- Corpus Christi, Texas
- Pelham Parkway, New York
- Staten Island, New York
- Tucson, Arizona

1955

- Boston, Massachusetts
- Durham, North Carolina
- Harrisburg, Pennsylvania
- Kingsbridge Heights, Bronx, New York
- Pittsburgh, Pennsylvania
- Richmond, Virginia
- St. Louis, Missouri
- San Antonio, Texas #1
- Windsor, Ontario, Canada

1956

- Birmingham, Alabama #2
- Cleveland, Ohio
- Detroit, Michigan
- Kansas City, Missouri
- Long Beach, California #1
- New Brunswick, New Jersey
- Oakland, California #2
- San Antonio, Texas #2
- San Diego, California
- Toronto, Ontario, Canada #2

1957

- Dallas, Texas
- Newburgh, New York
- Salt Lake City, Utah
- Toronto, Ontario, Canada #3

1958

- Long Beach, California #2
- Toronto, Ontario, Canada #3

== Publications ==
- Norbert Troller. Theresienstadt: Hitler's Gift to the Jews. The University of North Carolina Press, 1991.ISBN 978-0-8078-1965-4

== Literature ==
- Magazine Interior Design. May, 1953, pp. 74 – 79
- Newspaper Chicago Sunday Tribune, May 1, 1949, Part 1, page 6
