= Buntrock =

Buntrock is a surname. Notable people with the surname include:

- Bobby Buntrock (1952–1974), American child actor
- Dean Buntrock (born 1931), American businessman and philanthropist
- Fritz Buntrock (1909–1948), German war criminal
- Sam Buntrock (born 1975), English stage director
