= Leo Holzer =

Austrian-Czech firefighter and Holocaust survivor

Leo Holzer, photographed at Terezín in September 1945

Leo Holzer (1902 – January 1989) was an Austrian-Czech firefighter and Holocaust survivor best known for leading the fire brigade inside Theresienstadt concentration camp, which he used as a cover for resistance activities. After the war, he remained in communist Czechoslovakia and became an advocate for Czech-German reconciliation.

== Life ==
Holzer was born into a Jewish family of Czech origin in Kobersdorf, Austria-Hungary (now Austria), in 1902. In 1919, following the dissolution of the Austro-Hungarian Empire, Holzer elected to become a citizen of the new country of Czechoslovakia. He graduated with a degree in engineering, but continued to live in Austria, where he served on several volunteer fire brigades. In 1936, he moved to the town of Kolín and opened a firefighting business with a friend from Austria. After the German invasion of Czechoslovakia in 1939, Holzer managed to hide his Jewish heritage for some time, despite the fact that he was religious, because his business partner did not betray him. After the business partner was decapitated by a wire laid by Czech resistance operatives in 1940, Holzer went into hiding, but was eventually discovered and deported as part of the Aufbaukommando to Theresienstadt concentration camp in late 1941, becoming the head of the firefighting and air raid department.

Theresienstadt was largely used as a transit camp for deporting Jews to Nazi ghettos and extermination camps, but as a member of the Aufbaukommando and important functionary in the camp, Holzer was protected from deportation. Under his leadership, the fire brigade helped control the flooding on the nearby Elbe river and repair buildings after storms. They also put out fires set by drunken SS men. Using his influence in the camp, Holzer recruited members of the resistance into the fire brigade to prevent their deportation; he later estimated that half of firefighters were engaged in resistance activities. Holzer saved Siegfried Lederer from deportation for almost two years in this way. Lederer was eventually deported to Auschwitz in December 1943, but escaped the following April in order to warn the population of Theresienstadt that deportees faced mass murder in gas chambers. However, the leadership of the Theresienstadt resistance (including Holzer) ultimately decided to suppress the report because they feared it would lead to disorder and catastrophe. Nevertheless, Holzer and other fire brigade members helped Lederer smuggle weapons and a radio transmitter into the concentration camp. In the last days of the camp's existence in April and May 1945, it was feared that the Germans would attempt to murder the remaining inhabitants. Holzer and the fire brigade threatened resistance with hoses and other improvised weapons.

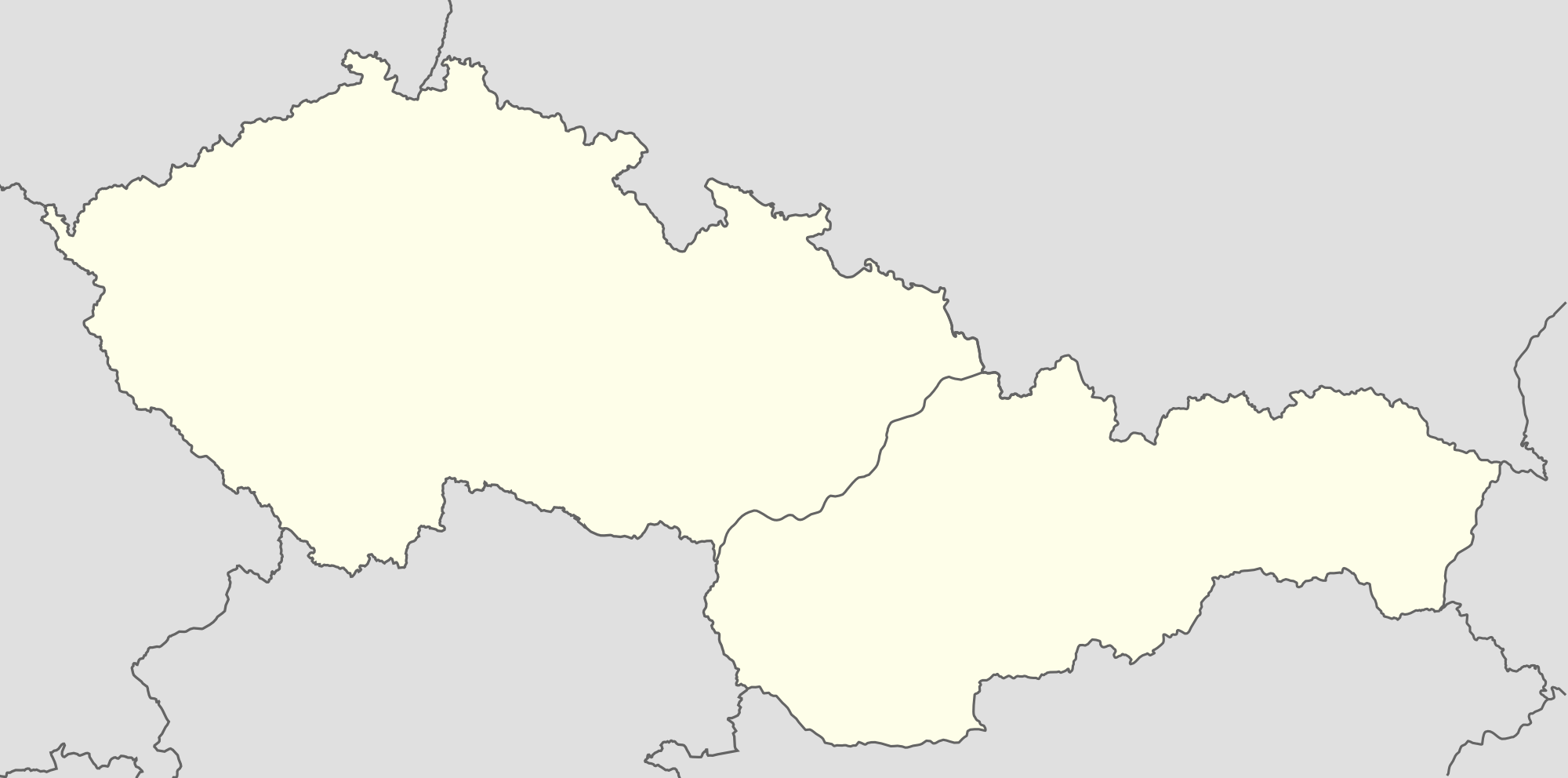
Czechoslovakia (1945–1989 borders)

After liberation, Holzer returned to Prague and married Wilma; both were the only survivors of their families. About 40,000 Czechoslovak Jews had declared themselves ethnic Germans on prewar censuses, of whom about 3,000 survived the Holocaust. These Jews were targeted for deportation during the expulsion of Germans from Czechoslovakia; Holzer was one of the few allowed to remain. He chose not to emigrate after the 1948 Communist takeover and worked as a factory manager. Unusually, Holzer was not subject to strict travel restrictions that the Communist regime imposed on most of its citizens and frequently visited Western Europe. He had many friends from his firefighting activities, and worked on Czech-German reconciliation. The Austrian government granted him a small pension in 1967 in recognition of his pre-war firefighting career; Holzer was allowed to receive the money in a blocked foreign account, which he used to fund his foreign travels. When he died in January 1989, the Czech government allowed his foreign friends to attend his funeral.
