= Erich Kulka =

Czech-Israeli writer, historian and journalist

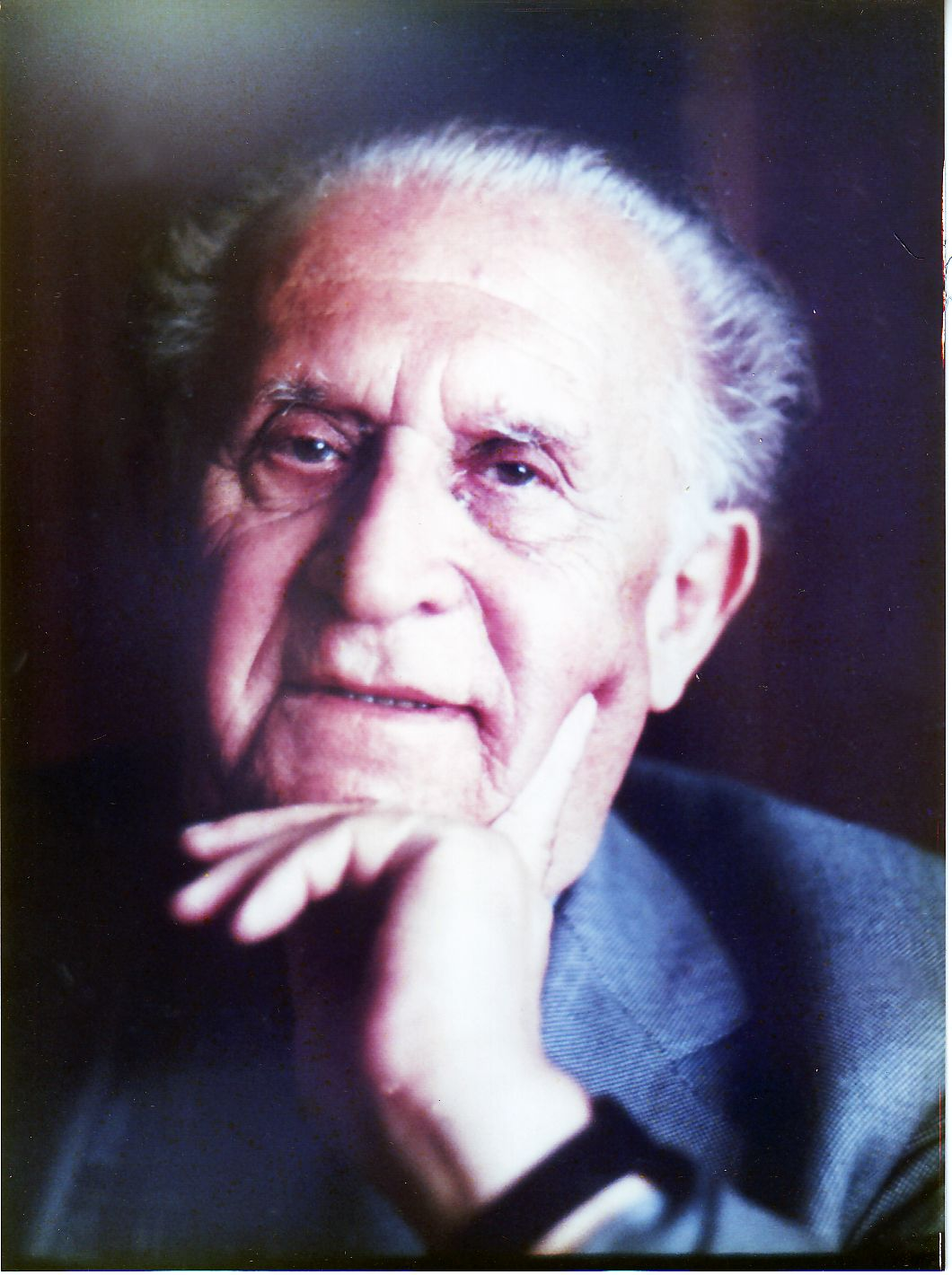
- Kulka in 1993
- Born: Erich Schön; 18 February 1911; Vsetín, Austria-Hungary
- Died: 12 July 1995 (aged 84); Jerusalem, Israel
- Citizenship: Czech (1911), Israeli (1968)
- Occupations: Writer, historian, journalist

Erich Kulka (18 February 1911 – 12 July 1995) was a Czech-Israeli writer, historian and journalist who survived the Holocaust. After World War II, he made it his life's mission to research the Holocaust and publicize facts about it.

== Biography ==
=== Early life ===
Erich Kulka was born as Erich Schön to a Jewish family as the youngest of five children in Vsetín. His parents were Siegbert (Vítězslav) Schön and Malvína Schön. Erich studied at Gymnasium in Valašské Meziříčí. In early 1930s he started to work for a company of Rudolf Deutelbaum. He had a secret relationship with his wife Elly (née Kulka) and fathered a son, Otto (born 1933). Erich and Elly married in 1938.

=== Concentration camps ===
In 1939 after the outbreak of World War II, he was arrested by the Gestapo for anti Nazi activity in Špilberk prison, an old castle on the hilltop in Brno, Southern Moravia. Later during the war he was transferred and managed to survive throughout five-and-a-half years in other concentration camps: Dachau, Sachsenhausen, Neuengamme, and 28 months in Auschwitz, from 1942 to 1945. In Auschwitz – Birkenau he worked with Ota Kraus and other Jewish prisoners in a workshop. Thanks to his position in the maintenance squad he had access to most of the Birkenau camps, so he could help fellow prisoners, act like a messenger, carry medicines and letters concealed in the hollow handles of his tools and even meet his wife and son in what came to be called the "Czech family camp". They arrived in September 1943 on a transport of 5,007 people from Theresienstadt. It was different from other transports: there was no selection and gassing, families were allowed to stay together, they were not shaved and they received old civilian clothes and shoes rather than striped prison grabs and wooden clogs and were not sent outside to perform hard forced labor. They could write to friends left behind in order to reassure them that conditions at the work camp Birkenau, near Neu-Berun, were bearable. This was the real reason for their lenient treatment which ended after six months by brutal liquidation of the family camp.

During the evacuation of Auschwitz in January 1945, Kulka managed to survive a three-day death march, and to escape while their train passed in Czechoslovakia together with his twelve-year-old son, Otto Dov Kulka. After a series of risky episodes, in constant fear of betrayal, they ended up sheltering with the Frýdl family in the mountain village of Liptál.

Erich Kulka's father, Siegbert, had been taken to Sachsenhausen concentration camp as early as 1941, and perished there. Other transports from Theresienstadt to Auschwitz were selected and gassed in the regular way—thus perished Kulka's mother, Malvína, and two sisters Elisabeth and Josephine; his brothers Otto and Albert survived. His wife, Elly, was transferred to Stutthof and died during an escape attempt. After the war both Erich and Otto changed their surnames to Kulka to honor their wife and mother.

=== Post-war ===
In 1956, he donated photographs to the Auschwitz-Birkenau State Museum. After the war, he wrote with his friend in prison Ota Kraus the book The Death Factory, now considered a classic documentary book about Auschwitz. It has been translated into many languages and about a million copies have been sold worldwide. A special chapter in the book is devoted to the history and demise of the "family camp" in Birkenau, describing the murder of thousands of Czech Jews. The book was published in seven editions in Czech and translated into many other languages.

Another book, Night and Fog (co-authored with Ota Kraus), is a study of the economic system of Nazi concentration camps and genocide motives.

His book Judges, Prosecutors, Advocates deals with the Frankfurt Trials of Auschwitz war criminals. In 1964, Erich and his son, Otto Dov Kulka, testified in these trials in Frankfurt, Germany. His son Dov became a professor of modern Jewish history, at the Hebrew University of Jerusalem. Other scientific and literary publications from this period covered the trial of Eichmann in Jerusalem. The historical novella Escape from Auschwitz, based on the true escape story of a Czech prisoner, Siegfried Lederer from the "family camp" in Birkenau, and his attempts to warn the Jews in Terezin (Theresienstadt) ghetto, and the international community about the extermination of Jews by the Nazis.

=== Move to Israel ===
After the Soviet invasion to Czechoslovakia in 1968, Kulka immigrated to Israel. He continued his research activities at the Hebrew University and at the Yad Vashem institute resulting in a first-time-in-history study relating to the significant participation of Jews from the Czech Republic and Slovakia in World War II for the liberation of Czechoslovakia: "Jews in Svoboda's army in the Soviet Union" and "Jews in the Czechoslovak Army in the West".

In Israel, Kulka was among the most active members of the "Association of Immigrants from Czechoslovakia" and in the "Israel-Czechoslovakia Friendship League". In 1977 he was among the founders of the Museum of Tolerance of the Simon Wiesenthal Center in Los Angeles. Other projects included the establishment of the World Association of Auschwitz Survivors and publishing of the journal 'The Voice of Auschwitz Survivors', in English, Hebrew and German. In 1982, he was a contributor for the BBC program, The Gathering.

=== Post-communist Czech Republic ===
After the 1989 Velvet Revolution in Czechoslovakia, Kulka devoted himself to the renewal of Jewish life at the Jewish community in Prague, participation in international conferences and delivering lectures in the Czech Republic and in Slovakia. During this period, he also published new and expanded Czech editions of his previous books and his other publications. A monument in his hometown Vsetín was built on his own initiative, on the site of the synagogue that was burned by the Nazis. Another project he initiated is erecting stone tablets on the wall at the entrance to the Vsetín Jewish cemetery, with engraved names of the holocaust victims from his home town and the surroundings. Until the last year of his life he was actively involved in the rehabilitation of political relations, scientific and cultural relations between Israel and the Czech Republic.

In recognition of his life's work Erich Kulka was awarded in 1989 an honorary doctorate by the Spertus College of Judaica in Chicago.

In 1993, he founded at the Hebrew University in Jerusalem a fund that bears his name, which provides scholarships for outstanding doctoral research in the history of Czech Jews and the Holocaust. Most of the awardees are lecturers in Israeli universities, in Harvard and in Moscow.

His scientific library is maintained at Beit Terezin in Givat Haim kibutz and his personal archive is in the central archives of Yad Vashem in Jerusalem and in the Moreshet Archive in Givat Haviva.

In November 2004 a statue was created in his memory (portrait sculpture by the Czech artist Josef Vajce) in the Theresienstadt Ghetto Museum in the Czech Republic. In 2011, his 100th birthday, the Hebrew University of Jerusalem and the Jewish Museum in Prague, published a file of articles in his memory (Czech, English, and Hebrew) by the name: "Erich Kulka 1911 to 1995, Life as a Mission in Memory of Those Who Did Not Return".

== Books & publications ==
- We Dead Accuse! (co-authored with Ota Kraus) – (Czech: My mrtví žalujeme!) in Vsetín 1945.
- The Death Factory (co-authored with Ota Kraus) – (Czech: Továrna na smrt) Prague 1946, 1950, 1955, 1956, 1957, 1959, 1964; German: Berlin 1957, 1958, 1991; Hungarian: Budapest 1957, 1958; Russian: Moscow 1960 Estonian: Tallinn 1960; Hebrew: Jerusalem 1960; Romanian (Fabrica morții): Bucharest 1959, 1963, 1992; English: Oxford 1966; Greek: Athens 1979.
- Night and Fog (co-authored with Ota Kraus) – (Czech: Noc a mlha) Prague 1958, 1966; Hungarian: Budapest 1961; German: Berlin 1963.
- The Frankfurt Trial – (Czech: Frankfurtský process) Prague 1964.
- Judges, Prosecutors, Advocates' – (Czech: Soudcové, žalobci, obhájci) Prague 1966; Slovak: (Tu sa končia stopy SS…) Bratislava 1965.
- Escape from Auschwitz – (Czech: Útěk z tábora smrti) Prague 1966, 2011; English: Pergamon Press, 1966; South Hadley, USA, 1986.
- The Kidnapping from San Fernando – (Czech: Únos ze San Fernanda, with Věra Trochtová) Prague 1968.
- Catalog of Testimonies and Documents on the Participation Czechoslovak Jews in the War Against Nazi Germany – Jerusalem 1976.
- The Holocaust Is Being Denied!: The answer of Auschwitz survivors – English: Tel Aviv, 1977; German: Jerusalem, 1975, Tel Aviv 1977.
- Jews in Swoboda's Army in the Soviet Union – Czechoslovak Jews fighting the Nazis during the World War II. – (Czech: Židé v československé Svobodově armádě) Toronto 1979, samizdat (Charta 77), Prague 1981, Prague 1990; Hebrew, Jerusalem 1977; English: Jews in Svoboda's army in the Soviet Union, Jerusalem, London, New York 1987; University Press of America, 1979, ISBN 978-0-8191-6577-0.
- "Attempts by Jewish Escapees to Stop Mass Extermination", Jewish Social Studies 47:3/4, Summer/Fall 1985.
- Jews in the Czechoslovak Army in the West – (Czech: Židé v československém vojsku na západě) Prague 1992.
