= Siegfried Lederer's escape from Auschwitz =

1944 prisoner escape from Auschwitz concentration camp

Coordinates: 50°02′09″N 19°10′42″E

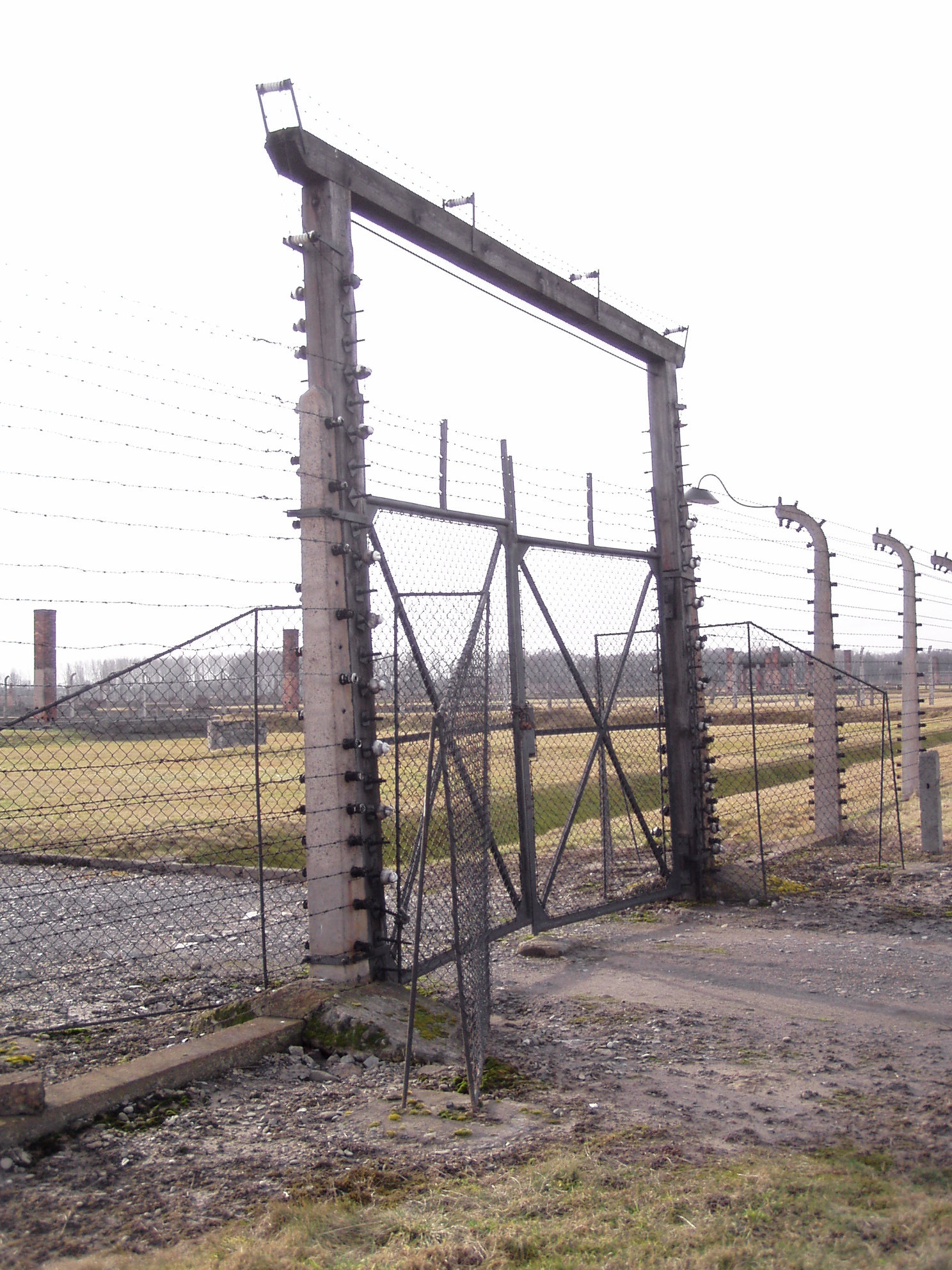
- Gate of the "family camp" at Auschwitz II–Birkenau
- Date: 5 April 1944
- Venue: Theresienstadt family camp of Auschwitz II-Birkenau
- Location: East Upper Silesia, Nazi Germany
- Type: Escape
- Participants: Viktor Pestek, Siegfried Lederer
- Outcome: Lederer reports to the Theresienstadt leaders about Auschwitz; Pestek executed for favoring inmates and desertion

On the night of 5 April 1944, Siegfried Lederer, a Czech Jew, escaped from the Auschwitz concentration camp wearing an SS-TV uniform provided by SS-Rottenführer Viktor Pestek. Pestek opposed the Holocaust; he was a devout Catholic and was infatuated with Renée Neumann, a Jewish prisoner. Pestek accompanied Lederer out of the camp, and the two men traveled together to the Protectorate of Bohemia and Moravia to obtain false documents for Neumann and her mother.

Lederer, a former Czechoslovak Army officer and member of the Czech resistance, tried unsuccessfully to warn the Jews at Theresienstadt Ghetto about the mass murders at Auschwitz. He and Pestek returned to Auschwitz in an attempt to rescue Neumann and her mother. Pestek was arrested under disputed circumstances and later executed. Lederer returned to occupied Czechoslovakia, where he rejoined the resistance movement and attempted to smuggle a report on Auschwitz to the International Committee of the Red Cross in Switzerland. After the war he remained in Czechoslovakia. The story of the escape was retold by Lederer and writers including historian Erich Kulka.

== Siegfried Lederer ==
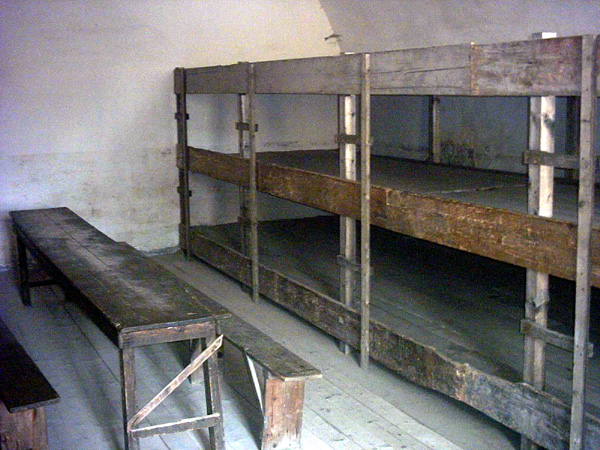
A room in the Small Fortress

Siegfried Lederer [cs] or Vítězslav Lederer (6 March 1904 – 5 April 1972) was born to a Jewish family in Písařova Vesce in the Sudetenland, the German-speaking part of Czechoslovakia. After the Sudetenland was annexed to Germany in 1938, he moved to Plzeň and did manual labor, including agricultural work and a stint in a kaolin factory. According to Lederer, he joined the Association of Friends of the Soviet Union, was influenced by Communist leader Marie Škardová, (Note: For her resistance activities, Škardová was sentenced to death and executed in 1943. The indictment does not mention Lederer.) helped those living in hiding, and distributed illegal publications. Lederer also said that he was a member of the resistance group named after Lieutenant Colonel Jaroslav Weidmann. Later, Lederer joined Plzeňák 28, a Czech resistance group in Zbraslav so called because it had twenty-eight members, including Josef Pokorný, commander of the Zbraslav gendarmerie.

In November 1939 and again in November 1940, Lederer was arrested by the Gestapo for alleged resistance activity. On both occasions, he was quickly released because of a lack of evidence. He was arrested a third time and imprisoned with other political prisoners at the Small Fortress of Theresienstadt. On 18 January 1942, he was transferred to the adjacent Jewish ghetto, and was supposed to be deported on the next transport. Leo Holzer, the leader of the ghetto fire brigade—a hotbed of resistance (Note: After the war, Holzer estimated that half the men in the fire brigade were in the resistance.)—heard about Lederer's resistance activities and postponed his deportation by recruiting him into the fire brigade. Lederer later claimed that he had maintained contact with the Plzeňák 28 while at Theresienstadt, but survivors of that group testified that they had heard nothing from him until his escape. He was dismissed from the fire brigade and lost his protection from deportation because he was caught smoking. Deported to Auschwitz concentration camp on 18 December 1943, Lederer was forced to wear both yellow and red triangles, marking him as a Jew and a political prisoner. There is no evidence that he was involved in the Auschwitz resistance movement.

== Viktor Pestek ==
Viktor Pestek [cs, de] (18 April 1924 – 8 October 1944) was born in Czernowitz, Bukovina—which was then Romanian territory—to a devoutly Catholic ethnic German family. Auschwitz guard Stefan Baretzki grew up in the same town; he and Pestek were acquaintances as children. Pestek's father was a blacksmith and a small farmer; Pestek learned these trades as a young man. He joined the Waffen-SS, either because of his innate sense of adventure, or because of persuasion by his mother. During his service, Pestek fought in anti-partisan warfare near Minsk, Belarus. His unit was ordered to attack a village suspected of containing partisans, and to kill its inhabitants. When Soviet partisans opened fire at the Germans, they hit Pestek in his arm and in his leg. Separated from his unit, he and another wounded SS man named Werner hid in a barn.

After Werner had died of his injuries, partisans discovered Pestek. Despite the SS killings in the village, the partisans spared his life. This humane treatment in enemy hands caused him to have a change of heart and convinced him to oppose Germany's policies of genocide. According to Siegfried Lederer, Pestek said that he was a "killer, and a Soviet partisan spared my life anyway". (Note: German: Ich war ein Mörder, und mir, dem Mörder, hat ein sowjetischer Partisan das Leben geschenkt.) By the time of his return to a German-controlled area, he had lost the use of his hand. Found unfit for front-line service, he was posted to the Auschwitz concentration camp as a guard. Pestek was an SS Rottenführer, which was a junior non-commissioned rank.

== Auschwitz ==
=== Background ===
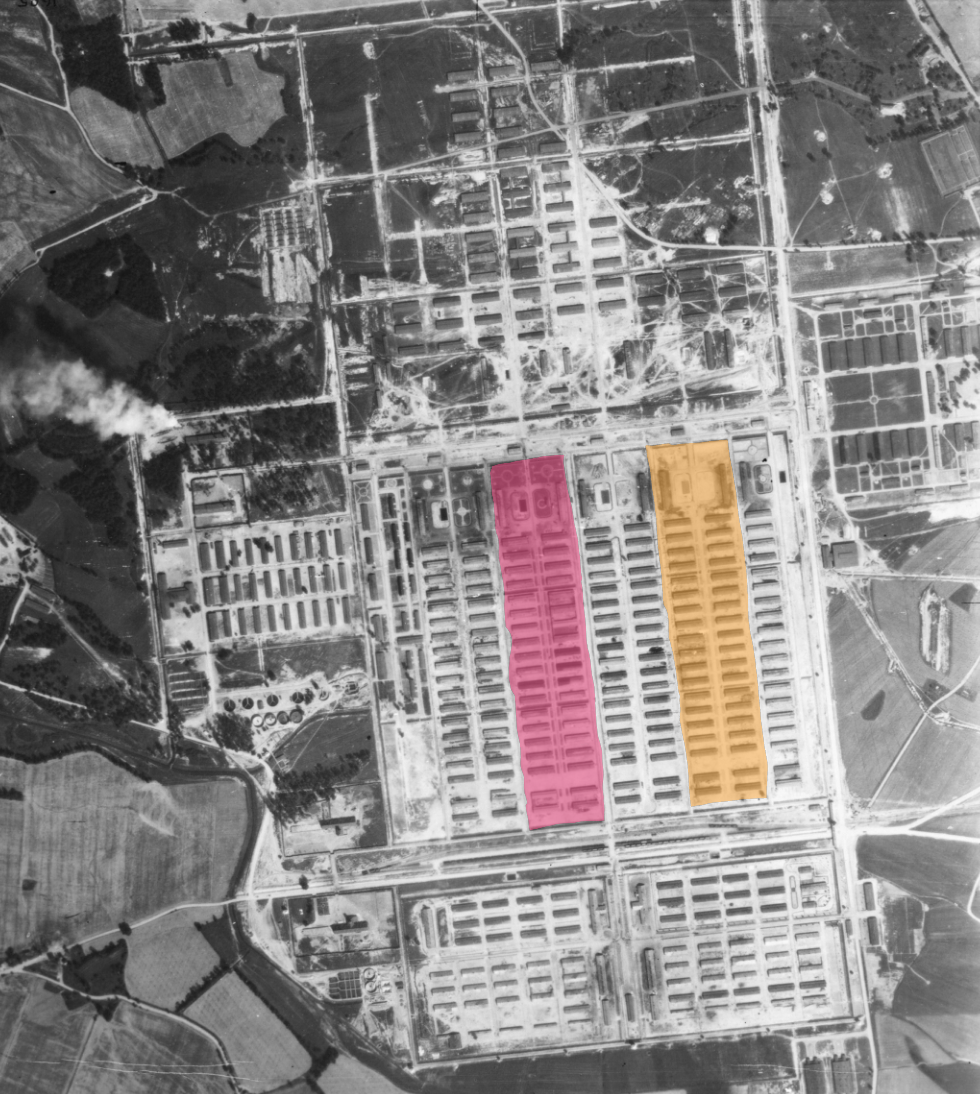
BIId (pink) and BIIb (orange) highlighted on an aerial photograph of Birkenau.

Jews transported from Theresienstadt to Auschwitz between September 1943 and May 1944 were housed in a separate block at Auschwitz II-Birkenau, known as the Theresienstadt family camp. They were not subject to selection upon arrival, were allowed to retain their civilian clothes, and were not forced to shave their heads. Families were allowed to stay together and write to their friends and relatives in an attempt to mislead the outside world about the Final Solution. The Nazis, however, were planning to kill each group of prisoners six months after their arrival.

Pestek was initially appointed the supervisor of section BIId of Auschwitz II-Birkenau. Although he quickly developed a reputation for trading contraband, he was disgusted by the mass killings at Auschwitz and by the contempt of some German SS members for Volksdeutsche (ethnic Germans from outside Germany), who comprised the majority of Auschwitz guards. Some SS men formed relationships with Jewish women in the family camp because, unlike other prisoners, they had been allowed to keep their hair. Pestek fell in love with Renée Neumann, a Czech Jewish prisoner at the family camp, although she did not return his affection. He arranged for Neumann to get a job as a block clerk and offered to help her escape by disguising her as an SS woman. This was unsuccessful, partly because Neumann was unwilling to leave her mother. According to Czech historian Miroslav Kárný, Pestek decided against escaping with Neumann and her mother because of their lack of contacts in the Czech underground who could help him evade prosecution until the end of the war.

On 8 March 1944, exactly six months from their arrival, the Jews from the family camp who had arrived in September were all gassed without a selection to find those able to work. Pestek rescued Neumann and her mother by temporarily moving them to a different block. Lederer was appointed block elder (Blockältester) of Block 14 within the family camp later that month. Alfred Cierer, a Czech Jewish industrialist, and his son Jakov Tsur moved in because they knew Lederer. Realizing he would have to act quickly to save Neumann's life, Pestek began to approach other prisoner functionaries and offer to help them escape. Among them were Rudolf Vrba and Alfred Wetzler, who refused the offer because they believed it was a trick, and advised other prisoners not to trust Pestek. Previously, an SS man named Dobrovolný—an ethnic German from Slovakia—had met a Jewish childhood friend at Auschwitz. Dobrovolný offered to help him escape but then turned him in, resulting in his brutal execution and a bonus for the SS man. This and similar incidents persuaded Vrba, Wetzler and other prisoners that guards could not be trusted under any circumstances. According to Wetzler, Pestek told him, "I hate myself for having to watch women and children be killed. I want to do something to forget the smell of burning human flesh and feel a little cleaner." (Note: Czech: Nenávidím sám sebe za to, že se musím dívat na to, jak jsou zabíjeny ženy a děti. Chtěl bych něco udělat, abych zapomněl na zápach pálícího lidského se masa a mohl se cítit trošku čistší.) Pestek also approached the Czech Josef Neumann (not a relative of Renée Neumann), a kapo on the Leichenkommando, which was responsible for the disposal of corpses; Neumann refused.

=== Escape ===
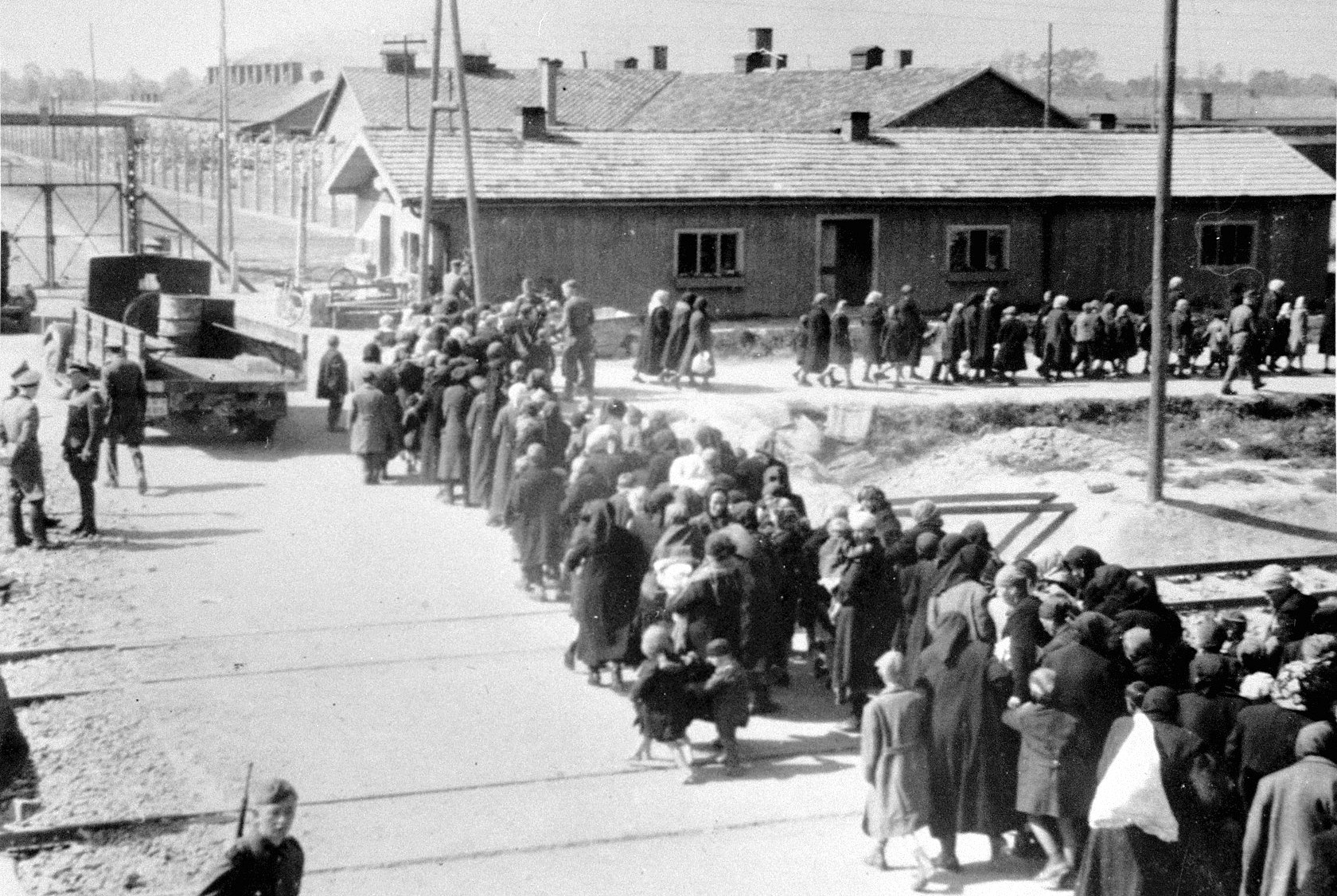
Hungarian Jews walking towards the gas chambers at Birkenau, 1944

According to Jakov Tsur, Pestek escorted Cierer to the Gestapo for interrogation and made an offer to him. When interrogated later, Cierer claimed the offer was only a transfer to another part of the camp, not a complete escape. Cierer, whose three children were with him in the family camp, refused the offer but suggested Lederer. Cierer and Pestek spoke in French to avoid being understood. Cierer later shared his contacts with Lederer in the hope that his escape would be successful, and the two men planned together how to break news of Auschwitz to the outside world—a plan they concealed from Pestek until after the escape. Other sources state that it was Lederer whom Pestek escorted to the Gestapo.

As a member of the family camp and because he was detained for his resistance activities, Lederer believed he had nothing to lose. He told Pestek he was wealthy and that his contacts in the underground would help Pestek and Neumann. Pestek and Lederer planned their escape, and their intended return to rescue Neumann, in considerable detail. Lederer would leave disguised as an SS man. After obtaining false documents in the Protectorate, Lederer and Pestek would return, impersonating SS officers, and present a forged Gestapo warrant for the arrest of Renée Neumann and her mother. The Auschwitz staff would provide a car and driver, who would be killed on the way to the Gestapo station. After disposing of the body, the escapees would take an express train to the Protectorate. The plan was based on Pestek's knowledge of protocol from his experience in the transport office.

Because he was a wounded soldier, Pestek was entitled to a long leave and requested it for 6 April 1944. On 3 April, he stole an SS uniform, pistol, and paybook for Lederer, who hid them in a double wall. Before standing guard at the gate of the family camp on the night of 5 April, Pestek left a bicycle by Lederer's barracks as a signal for him to come out. Pestek gave the correct passwords, telling the other guards Lederer was on special duty, and both men bicycled out of the front gate. They went to the railway station outside Auschwitz and caught a train to Prague, avoiding border control by pretending to be luggage inspectors. Lederer's absence was discovered in the morning of 6 April by an SS man inspecting the family camp who had seen a woman exiting Lederer's block and stepped in to investigate, only to discover Lederer missing. At 11:30, SS-Sturmbannführer Friedrich Hartjenstein, the commandant of Auschwitz II-Birkenau, sent a telegram to the German police (Note: The telegram was sent to the Reich Security Main Office, the SS Main Economic and Administrative Office, the Kriminalpolizei, the Gestapo, and the border police.) notifying them that Lederer had escaped, probably disguised as an SS-Rottenführer. Another telegram four hours later reported that an SS man—presumably Pestek—was under suspicion for aiding the escape. Cierer and others suspected of being close to Pestek or Lederer were interrogated.

== Aftermath ==
=== Obtaining false papers ===
Pestek's and Lederer's travels

In Prague, Pestek and Lederer sold jewelry that Lederer had obtained on the Auschwitz black market and bought civilian clothes. They also altered their uniforms to resemble Waffen-SS soldiers instead of concentration camp guards. From Prague they went to Plzeň, where they hid with Josef Černík, a former Czechoslovak Army officer who had earlier helped Lederer find work. The police circulated a photograph of Lederer but did not offer a reward for his capture. Brigitta Steiner, the daughter of a friend of Lederer's, provided false civilian papers for him. She was a Mischling whose partial German ancestry prevented her deportation. She also told them of Faltys, a Jew in hiding in Prague who could arrange the rest of the papers, including SS officer identification for Pestek and Lederer that would give them the authority to arrest Renée Neumann and her mother. Faltys demanded an exorbitant fee but offered a discount if they could smuggle another woman out of Auschwitz.

Several people helped hide Lederer during the summer of 1944. In May 1944, Lederer was hiding in Prague with Bedřich and Božena Dundr, at Vinohrady, Mánesova No. 16. Later, Lederer hid with Mrs. Dundr's brother Adolf Kopřiva in Na Závisti, Zbraslav, a suburb of Prague. The Černík, Dundr, and Kopřiva families collaborated closely, providing basic needs for Lederer, and Černík and his wife were shadowed and interrogated by the Kriminalpolizei. Josef Plzák, who had known Lederer in the resistance, was arrested in June 1944 under suspicion of helping to hide him. Plzák provided assistance to those hiding Lederer and did not betray him. Steiner, a German bank clerk named Ludwig Wallner whose Jewish sister-in-law had been deported to Auschwitz, and three others were indicted by the Nazi authorities for hiding Pestek and Lederer, and providing false papers for them.

=== Breaking into Theresienstadt ===
On 20 April, Lederer made the first of four or five visits to the Theresienstadt Ghetto. Unbeknownst to him, Lederer was not the first Auschwitz escapee to bring news of mass executions by gassing. Rabbi Leo Baeck, one of the leaders of the Jewish self-administration, had been informed by an anonymous escapee in August 1943. (Note: According to Baeck's testimony after the war, an unknown Mischling had been deported directly to Auschwitz and later transferred to a work detail, from which he escaped. With the help of a Czech gendarme, he smuggled himself into the ghetto to warn an engineer who was a friend of his, probably Julius Grünberger. Baeck heard the report from Grünberger in August 1943. Baeck did not tell anyone of this. In his memoirs, he wrote: "Living in the expectation of death by gassing would only be the harder. And this death was not certain for all—there was selection for slave labor; perhaps not all transports went to Auschwitz. So came the grave decision to tell no one." Grünberger's report spread as a rumor through Theresienstadt but many people refused to believe it.) Lederer went to the nearby village of Travčice, where he met with Václav Veselý, a barber who regularly went into the ghetto to shave the Czech guards; he knew Lederer and had helped the Jews in the past. Veselý told Lederer how to avoid the sentries, taking advantage of a security vulnerability around a hospital located outside the ghetto's perimeter. Lederer crossed the open ground outside the ghetto while the sentry was looking the other way and passed through a fence.

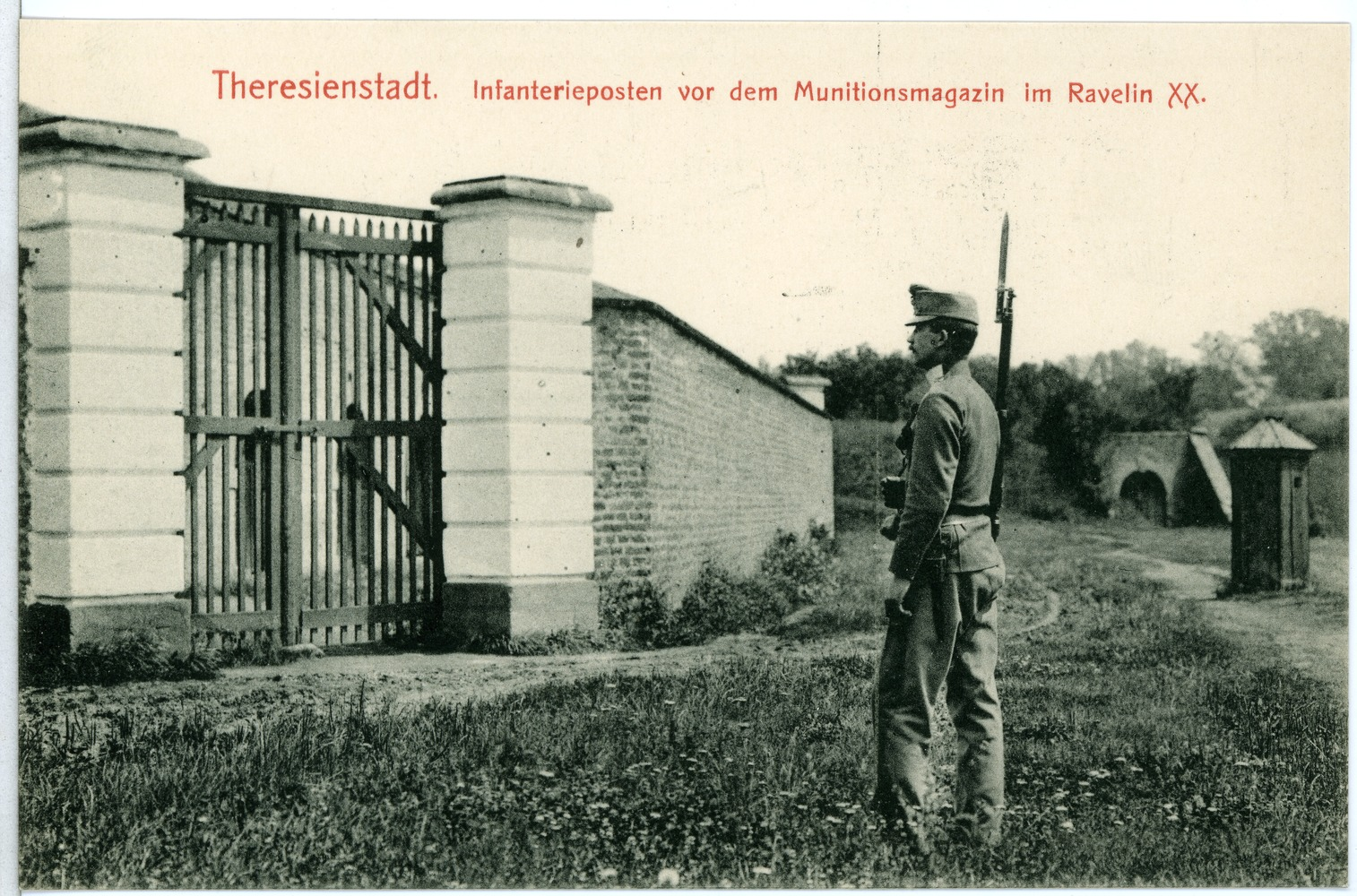
Fortifications of Theresienstadt (1910)

Lederer told Leo Holzer about what he had witnessed at Auschwitz, and according to his later testimony also informed Jirka Petschauer, the captain of the Jewish police inside the ghetto, and Otto Schliesser, a member of the Council of Elders. Holzer notified Baeck and Paul Eppstein, head of the self-administration. Eppstein, Baeck, and Holzer agreed the truth about Auschwitz must be kept strictly secret, lest a "catastrophe" befall the 35,000 prisoners at Theresienstadt at the time. Although rumors about the fate awaiting them at Auschwitz had already spread around the ghetto, many people refused to believe them. Almost all the Jews who were deported to the family camp in May 1944 were unaware of Lederer's previous visit to Theresienstadt, and the few who had access to Lederer's reports made no effort to avoid deportation. Even the resistance members in the fire brigade opposed armed resistance, trusting the June 1944 Red Cross visit to ensure the survival of Theresienstadt's Jews.

Explaining the reaction to the possibility of imminent death, Israeli historian and survivor Jakov Tsur stated that no one was capable of understanding Auschwitz until he or she had arrived and was undergoing selection. Miroslav Kárný said that he and his friends knew before their deportation on 28 September 1944 that there were gas chambers at Auschwitz, but that "no human being could accept these facts as truth". (Note: German: daß kein Mensch imstande wäre, diese Tatsachen als Wahrheit anzunehmen) Lederer made two or three trips into the ghetto in May, smuggling weapons and parts of a radio transmitter that he received from Josef Pokorný.

=== Return to Auschwitz ===
Pestek and Lederer returned to Auschwitz between late April and June, (Note: Langbein (2005, p. 445) gives the date as 23 May. Levine (2000, p. 218) has 26 May. According to Kárný (1997, p. 177), it could have been as early as late April (per Ryszard Henryk Kordek) or as late as June (per Lederer), who said that he had visited Constance first. Josef Neumann gave conflicting testimony on when the return had occurred, saying it was 25 May and late April at different times. According to Tsur (1994, p. 135), the June date is too late to be plausible; the return probably happened in late May.) planning to rescue Renée Neumann, her mother, and Faltys' relative. What happened afterwards is disputed. It is known the SS arrested Pestek and that Lederer escaped capture. According to Kárný, Pestek had overstayed his leave and was suspected of having helped Lederer escape, and therefore success was impossible under the circumstances. Lederer said Pestek had left some valuables with a Polish girlfriend in Myslowitz and that she reported him when he tried to retrieve them. Kárný disputes that Lederer could have known that she betrayed him because, according to Lederer, he had remained at the Auschwitz train station while Pestek continued to Myslowitz. Kárný concludes that the conflicting accounts make it impossible to know what happened, and he is convinced Lederer's account is not accurate.

Josef Neumann said he had been approached by an unknown SS man—probably Pestek—with an offer of escape. Before they could enact their plans, the alarm was raised and SS guards arrived. Neumann and Pestek were caught, handcuffed together, and carried away; both were interrogated and tortured at Block 11. SS guard Stefan Baretzki, who knew Pestek well, testified that Pestek had been arrested at Birkenau. Baretzki said he had seen other SS guards beating Pestek. Ryszard Henryk Kordek, a prisoner, said that Baretzki had raised the alarm over Pestek's return and that Baretzki was one of the guards who beat Pestek. SS man Perry Broad said he heard kapos bragging about chasing and catching Pestek in woods around the camp. Kárný hypothesizes that Pestek, realizing he had been recognized, gave up his plans to save Renée Neumann and her mother, and therefore made the offer to Josef Neumann. Pestek was sentenced to death by firing squad in Kattowitz for favoring inmates and desertion. He was executed in Międzybrodzie Bialskie on 8 October 1944 at 7:04. Members of Pestek's unit reported being ordered to witness the shooting. During the second liquidation of the family camp in July 1944, Neumann and her mother were selected for forced labor in the Hamburg area. Both survived the war.

=== Smuggling a report to Switzerland ===
In early June, Lederer attempted to smuggle a report on Auschwitz to the International Committee of the Red Cross (ICRC) in neutral Switzerland. In Plzeň, he met Czech journalist Eduard Kotora, to whom he confided his plans. Kotora accompanied Lederer to the Křimice station, where the latter boarded a train. Using false papers provided by Steiner and a false work permit provided by the Zbraslav resistance, Lederer continued to the Škodovák station, which was used by many Czechs crossing the border to work at the Škoda Works in the Sudetenland. According to Lederer, he was then driven to Constance, alternately dressed as a civilian and an SS officer. He met the widow of Werner, Pestek's SS colleague who was killed in action in Belarus, and gave her some of Werner's personal possessions that had ended up in Pestek's hands. Mrs. Werner introduced Lederer to the captain of a boat on Lake Constance, who agreed to smuggle the report across the border to Switzerland and send it to the ICRC.

There is no evidence the report reached its destination, or even that Lederer sent it as he described. Kárný writes that the most likely interpretation is that the skipper destroyed the report to avoid difficulties with border control. According to Czech historian Erich Kulka, the ICRC probably did not receive the report. Lederer said in 1967 that he had the opportunity to escape to Switzerland but decided not to because his family had already been killed by the Germans and he felt obliged to continue to fight. According to Kárný, Lederer regarded fleeing to Switzerland as cowardice and desertion, even though Kárný notes that his testimony on Auschwitz would have been more credible if he had delivered it in person.

=== Afterwards ===
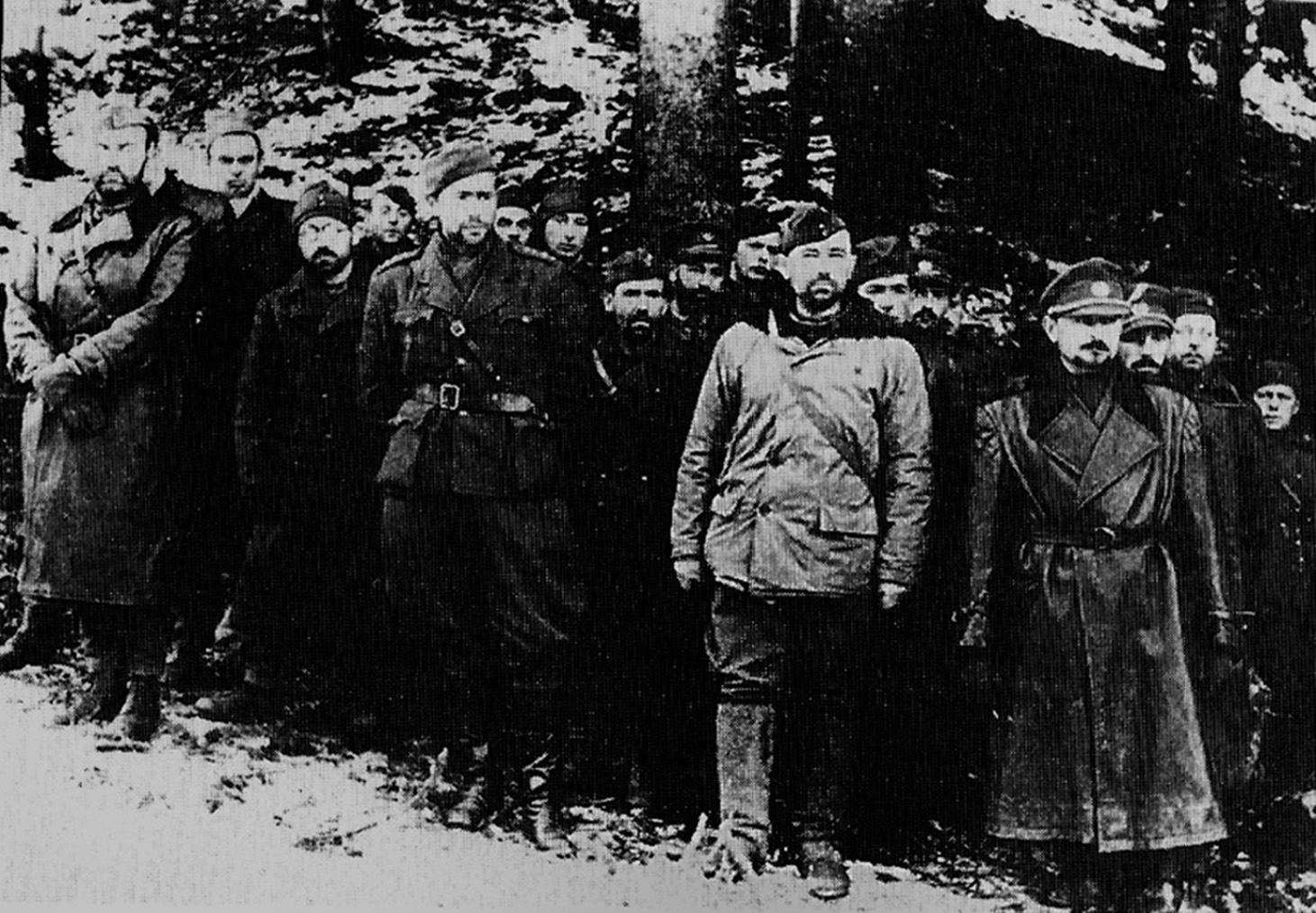
Slovak partisans during the uprising

According to Lederer, he joined the Kriváň partisan group and tried to cross the border to fight in the Slovak National Uprising (August–October 1944), and was wounded in the attempt. In November, he made his last visit to Theresienstadt, staying about eight days to compile a detailed report on the Small Fortress, the ghetto, and the Sudeten barracks to which the Germans had transferred the Reich Security Main Office archives in 1943. Lederer's report contained information for which, according to Kárný, "every Allied secret service would have given anything" (Note: German: Für ein Dokument dieser Art hätte jeder alliierte Geheimdienst mehr als alles gegeben.) to obtain. There is no evidence that Lederer tried to send it to the Allies.

Following this, Lederer said he returned to Zbraslav and joined a partisan group named after S. P. Vezděněv and continued his activity with Plzeňák 28. According to Kárný, Lederer's role in the latter group, which during 1944 focused on sabotaging the Roderstein capacitor factory and a local Wehrmacht installation is unclear. Kulka disagrees, stating that the report on Lederer's activities in the Plzeňák 28 group confirms his testimony "to the smallest detail". Lederer remained in Czechoslovakia after the 1948 Communist takeover and married. He died in Prague in 1972, aged 68.

== Assessment ==
Pestek was one of only two or three Auschwitz guards who risked their lives to help inmates escape. According to Austrian historian and Auschwitz survivor Hermann Langbein, his actions in particular indicate the limits of the absolute totalitarian hierarchy imposed by SS leaders. Langbein evaluates Pestek's actions more favorably than those of the guards who helped inmates escape during the evacuation of the camp in January 1945 in hopes of avoiding punishment for their crimes. One survivor described Pestek as "a decent person who never beat inmates" and Yehuda Bacon said he was "more humane" than other SS guards. Czech prisoners at the family camp reportedly called him "miláček", Czech for "darling". Bacon also said Pestek maintained confidential contact with Fredy Hirsch, a leader in the family camp until his death in the 8 March liquidation. According to psychologist Ruth Linn, Pestek may have helped Lederer in an attempt to distance himself from Nazi crimes because his home in Bukovina had been recently occupied by the advancing Red Army. Pestek is not recognized as "Righteous Among the Nations" by Yad Vashem.

Although described as "one of the most bizarre" escapes of World War II by historian Alan J. Levine, Lederer's flight was overshadowed by that of Rudolf Vrba and Alfred Wetzler two days later, which produced the Vrba–Wetzler report. Although some authors, including Levine, have connected Lederer's report to the fact that the second liquidation of the family camp spared those able to work, Miroslav Kárný emphasizes that the decision was made due to the increasing labor shortage. Kárný, who felt that Lederer's actions needed no embellishment, argued that Lederer and the Czech journalist Eduard Kotora, who publicized the former's actions, had exaggerated them, and that these distortions had been uncritically repeated by other writers. One influential, (Note: Escape from Auschwitz was first published in 1966 in both Czech (as Útěk z tábora smrti, Prague) and English (Pergamon Press, United States). In 1986, it was republished and made a Jewish Book Council selection. Publishers Weekly described the book as "a searing delineation of the horrors of the Nazi regime".) although in parts inaccurate, (Note: For example, Kulka's account of the trip to Switzerland was denied by all witnesses, and not supported by the documentary evidence.) account of the escape was Erich Kulka's semi-fictional 1966 book Escape from Auschwitz. Czech-born Israeli historian Yehuda Bauer wrote in the introduction of the book that "The story that Erich Kulka tells is not fiction". Kulka claimed that his work was historically accurate, even while describing it as a "historical novel".
