= Otto Dov Kulka =

Israeli historian, writer, and university teacher (1933–2021)

- אוטו דב קולקה
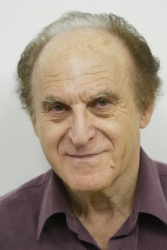
- Otto Dov Kulka. 2005
- Born: 16 January 1933; Nový Hrozenkov, Czechoslovakia
- Died: 29 January 2021 (aged 88); Jerusalem

Otto Dov Kulka (Ôttô Dov Qûlqā; 16 January 1933 in Nový Hrozenkov, Czechoslovakia – 29 January 2021 in Jerusalem; Hebrew: אוטו דב קולקה) was an Israeli historian, professor emeritus of the Hebrew University of Jerusalem. His primary areas of specialization were the study of modern antisemitism from the early modern age until its manifestation under the National-Socialist regime as the "Final Solution"; Jewish thought in Europe – and Jews in European thought – from the 16th to the 20th century; Jewish-Christian relations in modern Europe; the history of the Jews in Germany; and the study of the Holocaust.

== Biography ==
Otto Dov Kulka was born as Otto Deutelbaum in 1933, in Nový Hrozenkov, Czechoslovakia, to Erich Schön and Elly Deutelbaumová (née Kulková). Elly was at the time married to Rudolf Deutelbaum, Erich's uncle, who had taken Erich as his trainee. In 1938, Rudolf and Elly divorced, and Erich sued to be recognized as Otto's legitimate father. Following the German occupation of Czechoslovakia, in 1939, Erich Schön was arrested by the Gestapo and in 1942 transported from a concentration camp in Germany to the Auschwitz-Birkenau death camp. Rudolf Deutelbaum, along with his second wife Ilona and daughter Eva Deutelbaumová (Otto's half-sister), were deported in September 1942 to Theresienstadt Ghetto. In October 1942 they were deported to Treblinka extermination camp where they were murdered. Otto Kulka and his mother were deported in September 1942 to the Theresienstadt Ghetto, and from there, in September 1943, to the Theresienstadt family camp at Auschwitz II-Birkenau. His mother died in the Stutthof concentration camp in January 1945. After the war, he and his father returned to Czechoslovakia. To commemorate Erich's wife and Otto's mother they changed their family name to Kulka on the 23 April 1946.

Kulka immigrated to Israel in March 1949 and joined the Kibbutz Kfar Hamaccabi. He added a Hebrew name – Dov – to his original name. From 1958 until his death, he lived in Jerusalem. He was married to Chaia Kulka and was the father of a daughter, Eliora Kulka-Soroka.

Kulka began his academic studies in 1958, at the Hebrew University, and in 1966 joined the faculty of its Department of the History of the Jewish People.

He retired as professor emeritus in 1999 but kept up his research activity and continued to publish scholarly and other works.

The aesthetician Tomáš Kulka is his brother.

== Academic activity ==
Kulka studied philosophy and history at the Hebrew University of Jerusalem and at Goethe University Frankfurt. The subject of his doctoral thesis (1975) was "The 'Jewish Question' in the Third Reich. Its Significance in National Socialist Ideology and Politics and its Role in Determining the Status and Activities of the Jews". In 1985, he was appointed an associate professor, and in 1991 a full professor in the Hebrew University's Department of the History of the Jewish People. In 1984-1985 he was a Visiting Professor at Harvard University. Since 1988 he has held the Sol Rosenbloom Chair in Jewish History. He retired from teaching in 1999 after being diagnosed with cancer. He continued to conduct his research within the framework of the Hebrew University's Institute of Jewish Studies; his research projects on German Jewry under the Nazi regime were supported by the Israel Academy of Sciences and Humanities and the German-Israeli Foundation for Scientific Research and Development (GIF).

Kulka was for many years a member of the board of directors of Yad Vashem and the board of the Leo Baeck Institute for the Study of German and Central European Jewry. He was a member of the editorial board of the bilingual (Hebrew and English) journal "Yad Vashem Studies".

== Prizes ==
For his book Deutsches Judentum unter dem Nationalsozialismus (German Jewry under the National-Socialist Regime 1997):

- Buchman Memorial Prize, Yad Vashem, 1998.
- Wiznitzer Prize for best book published in Jewish studies, 1998, awarded by the Hebrew University's Institute of Jewish Studies.

For his book Landscapes of the Metropolis of Death (Landschaften der Metropole des Todes):

- Geschwister Scholl Prize, 2013, awarded by the Börsenverein des deutschen Buchhandels, the city of Munich and LMU Munich.
- Jewish Quarterly-Wingate Literary Prize for 2014, London.

== Research studies ==
=== Modern Antisemitism ===
From the outset of his academic activity, Kulka developed a conceptual and methodological approach to the study of Nazi Germany and the Holocaust which departed from the prevailing one-dimensional focus on the persecution and annihilation of the Jews. He maintained that the study of the history of the Jews under Nazism should follow the same scholarly principles that are applied to every historical period. Within this framework, he discerned three major topics of research: (1) Nazi ideology and policy on the Jews; (2) the attitude of the German population toward the regime's policy on the Jews and toward the Jews themselves; and (3) the Jewish society and its leadership. This comprehensive picture was then examined in the light of historical continuity and change. Only from this perspective, Kulka argued, could the question of the Nazi period's singularity and the "Final Solution" be properly addressed.

In line with this conception, Kulka made an effort to avoid using the terms "Shoah" or "Holocaust", neither of which, in his opinion, accurately encapsulates this period within the continuity of Jewish history and does not convey its singularity. Instead, he refers to "the history of the Jews under the National-Socialist regime," and, more frequently, to the "Final Solution." The first phrase derives from his methodological approach, holding that this period should be studied like any other and in the context of its historical continuity, in the three dimensions mentioned above. As for the term "Final Solution," Kulka considers it the most precise and most telling articulation of the teleological meaning of Nazi ideology and of the purpose underlying the realization of its goal: the termination of the historical existence of the Jewish people and the extermination of each individual Jew, as well as the eradication of the "Jewish spirit" ("jüdischer Geist") manifested in the European cultural heritage. It is here, that Kulka identifies the singularity of this period in Jewish and human history. As a scholar, Kulka has strictly separated the study of the historical past from his personal biography during the Second World War. As he noted in 2010, after completing the last of his major research projects to date, he regarded his biographical past irrelevant to historical research, and intertwining the two spheres as illegitimate. It was only in 2012, that he decided to publish a book bearing a different character. In this work, Kulka explores his memory images from the years he spent in the ghetto of Theresienstadt and in Auschwitz Birkenau, and reflects on them as a historian and thinker. First published in English in 2013 as Landscapes of the Metropolis of Death, Reflections on Memory and Imagination, the book has been widely translated.

=== The Jews in Nazi ideology and policy ===
In his research on modern antisemitism, Kulka drew, among other sources, on studies by his university teachers, the historians Jacob Talmon and Shmuel Ettinger, applying their insights to his empirical findings about National-Socialist ideology and policy. To gain a broader perspective, he examined the centrality of the ambivalent Jewish component in the major trends of Western culture in the modern age, as well as the radicalization of the elements of antagonism toward Judaism and the Jews within them. He explores these developments against the background of the secularization process of central ideological movements since the seventeenth century, the most radical of which in the twentieth century was Nazism. In 1989, Kulka articulated his approach succinctly:

Many scholarly works written on National Socialism over the past three decades have reached the conclusion that antisemitism played a vital role in the ideology and policy of the Third Reich. Of all the ideological and political ingredients that went into the making of Hitler's outlook, antisemitism, in its broadest sense, appears to be not only the one consistent and immutable element, it also bridges such seemingly contradictory leanings as anti-Marxism and anti-capitalism, the struggle against democracy and modernism, and a basic anti-Christian disposition. [...] Yet Hitler consistently portrays this ideological war in the international arena as an extension of the struggle that the National Socialist movement had waged, from its inception, against its ideological and political enemies within Germany itself: Jewish Marxism, Jewish parliamentary democracy, Jewish capitalism, and even the "Political Churches" and the Jewish foundations of Christianity. In the movement's racial-determinist conception, the Jews stand in an obviously dominant relationship to all these forces and factors as the biological source of doctrines and ideologies whose most radical expression is Bolshevism but whose origin was Judaism's introduction of Christianity into the Western world. National Socialist antisemitism traced the sense of crisis that dogged the modern world to its domination by 'Jewish-Christian-Bolshevik' principles that were based on a universalist 'destructive' belief in the unity of the world and the equality of men in all spheres of life. These principles were antithetical to the Nazi Social-Darwinist version of the 'natural order', i.e., the inherent inequality of the races and the eternal struggle between them for their very survival. Hence only the restoration of this order – which was conditional upon the absolute annihilation, physical and spiritual, of Judaism – could ensure the future health, indeed the very existence of the human race.

In an interview for the Hebrew-language newspaper Haaretz in 2013 he said,

My conclusion in regard to Nazi antisemitism is that it would have been impossible without the history of traditional Jew-hatred, but that the Final Solution would have been unfeasible in a traditional Christian society. This is because the existence of Judaism was a necessity in Christianity's perception of redemption: the idea that the Jews will recover from their blindness in the last days and see the light. However, only secularization and secular political messianism made possible the totalistic 'redemptive anti-Semitism' which was inherent in Nazi ideology and its attempt to change the course of human history.

Indeed, in his very first scholarly paper, "Richard Wagner and the Origins of Modern Antisemitism" (1961), Kulka identified and analyzed the phenomenon of "redemptive antisemitism." This was an ideology of political messianism, which in its various metamorphoses led ultimately to National-Socialist antisemitism and the "Final Solution." The term "redemptive antisemitism" has become, particularly since the 1990s, a reference point in research about Nazi Germany and the Holocaust.

=== Attitude of the population in Nazi Germany toward the Jews and toward the regime's anti-Jewish policy ===
Kulka published a monumental documentary study on this subject, which originally appeared in German, the language of the sources, in 2004, and in 2010 in an expanded edition in English. Decades earlier, in the mid-1960s, Kulka was one of the pioneers of scholarly research into this subject, later collaborating with his German colleague Eberhard Jäckel and the British historian Sir Ian Kershaw. Kulka had laid the methodological and theoretical foundations for these studies already in his seminal article of 1975, 'Public Opinion, in National-Socialist Germany and the 'Jewish Question." He showed that beneath the monolithic totalitarian encasement a certain diversity of social structures and political opinions remained from the pre-Nazi period. This was also reflected in the population's consent to the regime's policy toward the Jews, in various forms of criticism of that policy, and on the other hand, in anti-Jewish violence and "pressure from below" to accelerate and radicalize the policy of the "solution of the Jewish question in Germany." However, the dominant trend, as emerged clearly, was the constantly expanding and ever more extreme "removal" of the Jews from all spheres of life of the "German people's community" (Volksgemeinschaft) and finally from all of Germany.

Drawing on these sources, Kulka devoted a special study to the complex problem of the attitude taken by the churches and the religious population in Germany toward the Jews, including those who converted to Protestantism and Catholicism. In another study based on the above-mentioned highly reliable source material Kulka devoted a special article to the examination of another aspect - the popular opinion in Nazi Germany and the government's attitude toward the Jews. In this study he revealed the influence of the popular opinion as "a factor in the policy of the 'solution of the Jewish question'."

Kulka also considered it important to probe the abundant detailed information contained in these reports about the life of the Jews and their organized activity as they coped with both the regime's policy and the attitude of the German population toward them. He viewed the picture that emerged of the diverse, systematic, and continuous information that was presented to the various levels of the regime as a significant supplementary to what could be gleaned from the contemporary Jewish sources. Both types of sources show a thrust toward continuity – though organized Jewish activity is seen to undergo transformations. It became more intense as a dialectical response to the growing and consistently more acute efforts to remove the Jews from the various spheres of life of the German state and society.

The most critical question of the research concerned the German population and the "Final Solution." Prior to the publication of Kulka and Jäckel's documentation project, scholars – among them Kulka himself, Marlis Steinert, and Ian Kershaw – interpreted the reports' apparent silence regarding the Jews during the war years as reflecting the German population's indifference to the Jews' fate. According to Steinert and Kershaw, the German population took little interest in the Jews and their fate "because they had other things on their mind during the period of the war." At that time, Kulka viewed this apparent indifference, in the light of the reports about mass murder of Jews being perpetrated in "the east," as "abyssal indifference."

Kulka and Jäckel published nearly 4,000 reports on German public opinion and the Jews, close to 1000 of them from the war years. According to Kulka, in their light the assumption about the silence of the sources no longer meets the criterion of empirical research. The documentation also supported Kulka's earlier findings, described in his article of 1975, concerning the widespread reports that circulated among the German population about the mass annihilation of the deported Jews. In the newly found documentation from early 1942, the general consensus reported from most areas of the Third Reich was that the population wished to see all the Jews deported from Germany (in the German original: "Am meisten würde jedoch eine baldige Abschiebung aller Juden aus Deutschland begrüßt werden"). This attitude persisted despite the population's knowledge about the fate of the deported Jews, as evident from many accurate reports. Here, then, the term "abyssal indifference" takes on concrete meaning. As Kulka and Jäckel note at the closing of the Introduction to the English edition of their book: "The conclusion that can be derived from the reports on popular opinion, and from the subsequent published studies based on our edition, is a harsh one indeed."

=== The Jewish society and its leadership in Nazi Germany ===
This is a subject to which Kulka devoted a series of research articles as well as a book, German Jewry Under the National-Socialist Regime. His research was based on his project to reconstruct the lost archives of the central Jewish organization in the years 1932–1939, the National Representation of the Jews of Germany (Reichsvertretung der deutschen Juden), and his archival discovery of its successor organization in the years 1939–1945, the "Reichsvereinigung der Juden in Deutschland." Revising the prevailing historiography, Kulka showed that the National Representation of the Jews of Germany was not established in 1933, after the Nazis' rise to power, but that its foundations were laid a year earlier, in 1932.

In the light of the rapidly deteriorating political situation, the Jewish leadership in the various district states (Länder) realized that it was essential to create a united central organization to represent German Jewry vis-à-vis the regime. Similarly, Kulka showed that the successor to the National Representation, namely the National Association of Jews in Germany, was not established in 1939 after the Kristallnacht pogrom, solely at the order of the Nazi regime. In fact, it emerged under this name, and within a new central framework as the national organization of all the Jews in Germany, in the course of a lengthy internal process in 1938.

Kulka's comprehensive article, "Germany," in the Encyclopedia of the Holocaust, offers an overview of the developments among German Jewry in this period within their historical context, integrating the three areas of his research on this subject. Summing up his analysis of the status and activities of the Jewish society under the Nazi regime, he wrote:

Among the Jews, the reaction to what was happening was different on the individual and the organizational level. Although the Jews' social and political status had suffered a tremendous blow, their existing organizational network was scarcely touched – indeed, new organizations came into being. In this respect the situation of Jews was in stark contrast to the prevailing trend of totalitarian Gleichschaltung, the purpose of which was to destroy the existing social and political fabric of German society and construct a homogeneous society (Volksgemeinschaft) in its place. It was the exclusionary racist principle on which the policy towards the Jews was based – their separation and isolation from the general society – that made possible the continuing existence of the Jew's own institutions. Moreover, "alien" and "decadent" ideas and principles such as political pluralism and democracy, which were now beyond the pale among the general population, were still the rule in Jewish public life. This was, however, the freedom of the outcasts, of a community that now seemed doomed to disappearance.

According to Kulka, German Jewry faced three alternatives upon the establishment of the Nazi regime and the promulgation of the first anti-Jewish decrees in 1933.

The first alternative was the disintegration and atomization of Jewish society and the paralysis of all its institutions and organizations under the impact of the anti-Jewish waves of terror and legislation. In the lives of individuals, this was manifested in a hasty mass flight from Germany, the desperate return of some, and in extreme cases, through suicide. The second alternative, advocated by a small minority of so-called Nationaldeutsche Juden, was diametrically opposed to the first. It was the temptation to draw the ostensibly inevitable conclusions from the crisis and failure of the democratic system of Weimar, and by the same token from the failure of the internal democratic principles of the Jewish society, and introduce in their place – for all of German Jewry – a regime of authoritarian leadership based on the Führerprinzip. However, most Jewish organizations opted for a third alternative: the continued existence of the democratic-pluralistic institutions of the Jewish society from the post-Emancipation period and the establishment of a new all-inclusive central organization based on the principle of the voluntary affiliation of each body and free activity within the organization.

Kulka sums up his approach to the study of this period in the history of German Jewry as follows:

In my attempt to present the basic tendencies in the development of Jewish life from 1933 on, there are two different dimensions of time: the historical dimension of time and the time dimension of the Third Reich – defined teleologically, the period of the Final Solution. The first dimension explores this time against the background of continuity: what existed before 1933 and continued even if under an altered guise after that watershed. The second dimension relates to what was significantly new and novel, introduced and developed under the new regime. Both dimensions must be examined side by side. Of course, the first was predominant until 1938/1939, the second from then on to 1943 or even 1945.

=== Studies on historiography ===
A key element of Kulka's research on Nazi Germany and the Holocaust period is devoted to its historiography. The subject is addressed in several of his seminal articles. His article on the German historiography of National-Socialism and the "Jewish Question" from 1924 to 1984 was the first and most systematic on this complex topic until the publication of Nicolas Berg's comprehensive book on the subject in 2003. Another study discusses the basic tendencies in Zionist historiography of the Jews under the Nazi regime. His basic scholarly reviews on the historiography of the Holocaust period include extensive discussions devoted to two monumental two-volume works: Saul Friedländer's Nazi Germany and the Jews: The Years of Persecution, 1933-1939; and The Years of Extermination: Nazi Germany and the Jews, 1939-1945; and Ian Kershaw's biography of Hitler: Hitler 1889-1936. Hubris; and Hitler 1936-1945. Nemesis.

=== Studies on Central European Jewry in the twentieth century ===
Other studies by Kulka extend the exploration of the history of the Jews under the Nazi regime beyond Germany. These include: a joint project of the Hebrew University and the University of Vienna about Austria's Jewish citizens who found refuge from Nazi persecution in Mandate Palestine, and their life in Israel; an article on Czech Jewry from the establishment of the First Czechoslovak Republic, in 1918, until after the Munich Conference and the end of the Second Republic, in March 1939; and a comparative study on the history of the Jews in Germany and Czechoslovakia between the two world wars and in the Holocaust period.

In all his studies of the Nazi period, Kulka refrained from dealing with the final stage of the physical annihilation of the Jews in the death camps and with the mass executions in the German-occupied areas of Eastern Europe. His only departure from this practice was an article based on his discovery of unknown documents on the "family camp" of Jews from the Theresienstadt Ghetto in Auschwitz-Birkenau and its place in the Nazis' policy of camouflage and deception about the deportation of the Jews to the "east" for extermination. The article was published in 1984 in Hebrew as "Ghetto in an Annihilation Camp. The 'Family Camp' of the Theresienstadt Jews in Auschwitz, 1943-1944," and simultaneously in an English-language version with a significant difference in the title: "Ghetto in an Annihilation Camp. Jewish Social History in the Holocaust Period and its Ultimate Limits." It deals, inter alia, with the continuity of the patterns of life and the basic values of the Jewish society even in the very heart of the Auschwitz annihilation camp and in the face of a clear awareness of the certainty of death. The purpose of this special camp's existence and the reason for its liquidation – part of the policy of Adolf Eichmann's Jewish section in the Reich Security Main Office – did not become clear until long after the war. The riddle was solved when Kulka discovered a secret exchange of correspondence between Eichmann and his staff and the German Red Cross in Berlin, and between the latter and the headquarters of the International Red Cross in Geneva. This almost unknown episode was thus accorded its rightful place in Holocaust historiography. The article was reprinted as an appendix to shed light on the historical background of Kulka's "extra-scientific" book, Landscapes of the Metropolis of Death.

=== Other studies ===
In 1982, Kulka initiated a large-scale international conference within the framework of his activity in the Historical Society of Israel and his research on the relations between Judaism and Christianity in the modern era. Its theme was "Judaism and Christianity under the impact of National-Socialism from 1919 to 1945, in Germany and in all the European countries occupied by the Third Reich, its allies and vassal states." The volume of the conference's proceedings, edited by Kulka and published in 1987 by the Historical Society of Israel, has become a reference point for research and discussion about this highly charged, complex issue.

Among Kulka's studies of other historical periods, a special place is occupied by his seminal Hebrew-language study on sixteenth century Jewish Prague in its Central European setting. Titled "The Historical Background of the National and Educational Teachings of MaHaRaL from Prague", it appeared in the jubilee volume of the periodical Zion. The subtitle in the English-language abstract encapsulates the article's thrust: "A Suggested New Approach to the Study of MaHaRaL." Kulka's point of departure is Maharal's quasi-modern ideas, which had proved puzzling to many scholars. He too addresses the singularity of these ideas, reflected in the following quotation from Maharal's Netzach Yisrael concerning the substance of nations, their religious faith, and their place in creation:

"It is unworthy for a nation to be subjugated and yoked to another [nation], for the Holy One, blessed be He, created each and every nation unto itself. [...] For man chooses divinity which he will resemble in part. [...] Every nation chooses its divinity according to its own thoughts..." As for the Jewish people, its exile from its land and its redemption according to the same order of creation, Kulka continues to quote from Maharal with his unique style:

There is no doubt that the exile is a change and a departure from the order in which the Holy One, blessed be He, ordered each nation in its proper place and ordered Israel in their proper place, which is the Land of Israel. Exile from the place is a change and a complete departure, and all things, when they depart from their natural place [...] are unsustainable in the place that is not natural to them, until they return to their natural place. For if they were to remain in the place that is unnatural to them, what was unnatural to them would become natural, and this is something that is not possible, for the unnatural to become natural.

In his study, Kulka shed new light on the historical research into Maharal's ideas on nationhood and education, against a diverse background of sources and in the light of the contemporary political, social, and religious situation in Central Europe. According to Kulka it is inadequate to analyze Maharal's views only in the light of the writings of his Jewish contemporaries and predecessors. Insight about the distinctiveness of Maharal's ideas concerning nationhood and education, and the connection between them, could be gained by observing the historical setting in which he was active and examining possible influences to which he was susceptible in those specific circumstances. In his study of Maharal's national theory, Kulka thus probes the different channels through which Maharal was exposed to the distinctive fusion of religion and nationalism of post-Hussitic Bohemia in the Reformation era, not omitting national conflicts and the relations between the nations. Through the prism of this historical context, Kulka is able to address convincingly the singularity and originality of Maharal's creative Jewish thought and its relevance for his time.

Kulka applies a similar methodological approach in his inquiry into Maharal's innovative educational theory. One striking result of his research is the solution to the deeply puzzling similarities between Maharal's educational doctrine and that of the "teacher of nations", Jan Amos Comenius, as set forth by Aharon Kleinberger. According to Kleinberger, the fact that Comenius was just 17 when the Maharal died excludes the possibility that he influenced Maharal; and, ipso facto, the reverse influence is equally untenable. However, Kulka proves that Comenius, the last bishop of the humanistic Christian denomination of the Bohemian Brethren (in Latin: Unitas Fratrum), was the successor and codifier of the educational theories and methods of his teachers in this sect, who were Maharal's contemporaries and interlocutors.

This study concentrates initially on the twenty years of Maharal's tenure as "head of the [Jewish] communities of the State of Moravia," (אב בית דין וראש מדינת מעהרין) in close proximity to the educational center of the Bohemian Brethren. This center, with its superb Hebraists, translated and published the magnificent Czech-language edition of the Bible – Bible kralická. Some of Maharal's discussions and disputes with "Christian sages," which appear in his writings, took place in this milieu. Moreover, Kulka's approach, which sets Maharal within the relevant historical context, is not inconsistent with an appreciation of his creative originality. Although anchored in the reality of their time, Maharal's ideas draw on far deeper sources and bear implications that far transcend this period.

These issues, including Kulka's study, were discussed extensively in an international conference about Maharal, held in Jerusalem in 2009 to mark the four hundredth anniversary of his death. The conference's sponsors – the Israel Academy of Sciences and the Humanities and the Historical Society of Israel – are to publish the proceedings.

=== Landscapes of the Metropolis of Death ===
Kulka's book, Landscapes of the Metropolis of Death. Reflections on Memory and Imagination, was published almost simultaneously in various European languages and worldwide during 2013–14. It is fundamentally different from his scholarly works, as he attests in the introduction:

I assume that readers of my historical publications will have identified me unequivocally with an attitude of strict and impersonally remote research, always conducted within well-defined historical categories, as a kind of self-contained method unto itself. But few are aware of the existence within me of a dimension of silence, of a choice I made to sever the biographical from the historical past. [...] The hidden meaning of the metaphoric language of the central, recurrent motifs in the book, such as 'immutable law of the death', the 'Great Death', the 'Metropolis of Death', reaches beyond the experience of the world of Auschwitz. They are metaphors for what at the time seemed to expand into a world order that would change the course of human history and remained so in my reflective memory. I am also aware that these texts, though anchored in concrete historical events, transcend the sphere of history.

The book was extensively discussed in the press and the electronic media in Israel and throughout the world, particularly in England, France, and Germany. Most reviewers commented on its different style of language and observation amid the rich literature of the Holocaust period, and remarked on its special place alongside the autobiographical works of Saul Friedländer, Primo Levi, and Imre Kertész. Writing in the British Guardian newspaper, Thomas W. Laqueur noted, "Primo Levi's testimony, it is often said, is that of a chemist: clear, cool, precise, distant. So with Kulka's work: this is the product of a master historian – ironic, probing, present in the past, able to connect the particular with the cosmic." And, in Le Monde, Nicolas Weill wrote, "A book that defies categorization in any conventional genre. [...] The lucidity and temperance that accompany this stunning return to the past arouse amazement and astonishment." The book received two prestigious literary awards in Germany and Britain: The Geschwister-Scholl Prize and the Jewish Quarterly Literary Wingate Prize.

Czech historian Anna Hájková of University of Warwick criticized Kulka's book Landscapes of the Metropolis of Death: Reflections on Memory and Imagination for omitting his father and sister who died in Treblinka death camp. This, in spite of the following clear declaration of the author: "These recordings were neither historical testimony nor autobiographical memoir, but the reflections [...] of memory and imagination that have remained from the world of the wondering child of ten to eleven that I had once been".

In 2018 the German filmmaker Stefan Auch released the film "Die vorletzte Freiheit. Landschaften des Otto Dov Kulka" (The Freedom Last But One – Landscapes of Otto Dov Kulka), loosely based on the book, which premiered at the Jewish Film Festival in Jerusalem. In the film "we delve deep into the world of Otto Dov Kulka, following his thoughts about the inexplicability of history".
