= Fritz Buntrock =

German war criminal (1909–1948)

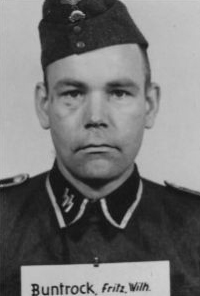
- Born: March 8, 1909; Osnabrück, German Empire
- Died: January 24, 1948 (aged 38); Montelupich Prison, Kraków, Polish People's Republic
- Occupation: SS-Unterscharfuehrer
- Political party: National Socialist German Workers' Party
- Status: Executed by hanging
- Motive: Nazism
- Conviction: Crimes against humanity
- Trial: Auschwitz trial
- Penalty: Death

Fritz Buntrock (8 March 1909 – 24 January 1948) was a Nazi German war criminal and SS-Unterscharführer (the SS equivalent to a corporal) serving at Auschwitz concentration camp during the Holocaust in occupied Poland. He was prosecuted at the first Auschwitz trial.

Due to his brutal treatment of prisoners he was nicknamed "Bulldog" in the camp. Buntrock supervised the gas chambers. Buntrock was tried by the Supreme National Tribunal in Kraków and sentenced to death. He was hanged in Montelupich Prison on 24 January 1948.
