= Czech–German Declaration =

The Czech–German Declaration is the abbreviated name of the Czech–German Declaration on the Mutual Relations and their Future Development, signed on the 21 August 1997. The Czech signatory of the declaration was the prime minister Václav Klaus and minister of foreign affairs Josef Zieleniec while the German side consisted of the federal chancellor Helmut Kohl and federal minister of foreign affairs Klaus Kinkel. The aim of the declaration was to improve the relations between both countries and to lessen the tensions still stemming from the World War II.

== Characteristics and contents ==
The Declaration has a prologue and eight parts. The prologue points out to the rich mutual cultural heritage of both sides and rejects solving old wrongs with new wrongs. In the first part, both parties declare that they both share the same democratic values and a need to take a clear stand on the past. In the second part, Germany proclaims full responsibility for the consequences brought about by the Nazi regime. In the third part, the Czech party expresses their regrets at the post-war expulsion of Germans from Czechoslovakia and the expropriation and revocation of citizenship of the Bohemian Germans, including the many injustices ("Unrecht" in the German version – lawlessness) and suffering of innocents that came of this. The Czech party also expresses regret at the excesses, during the expulsion, that went unpunished.

In the fourth part, both sides declare the wrongs committed a problem of the past and acknowledge the other side's right to a different opinion. This passage, though it is a compromise, is among the most controversial parts of the declaration in both countries – the German side declined to acquiesces to the Czech demands to declare the Munich Agreement null right from the start (as France and Italy did in the past) however they acknowledge the Czech right to consider it null. The sentence that "the wrongs committed are problem of the past" caused wide dissent among the Sudeten German organizations pushing for reparations for the expulsion.

In the fifth part, both sides declare intentions to support the minorities of other nations in their territory. In the sixth part, both sides declare a conviction that the membership of the Czech Republic in the EU will lead to a rapprochement of both countries and both sides promise that when considering applications for residence or work permits, they will take into consideration humanitarian reasons. The seventh part creates the joint Czech–German Fund for the Future, to be primarily used to support the victims of Nazi Germany. The final, eighth part is an agreement of both sides that this common history must be researched together and they promise to create a Czech–German discussion forum to breed Czech–German dialogue.

== See also ==
- Treaty of Prague (1973)
- Expulsion of Germans from Czechoslovakia
- Brno death march
- Final Solution of the Czech Question
- Munich Agreement
