= Liptál =

- Municipality
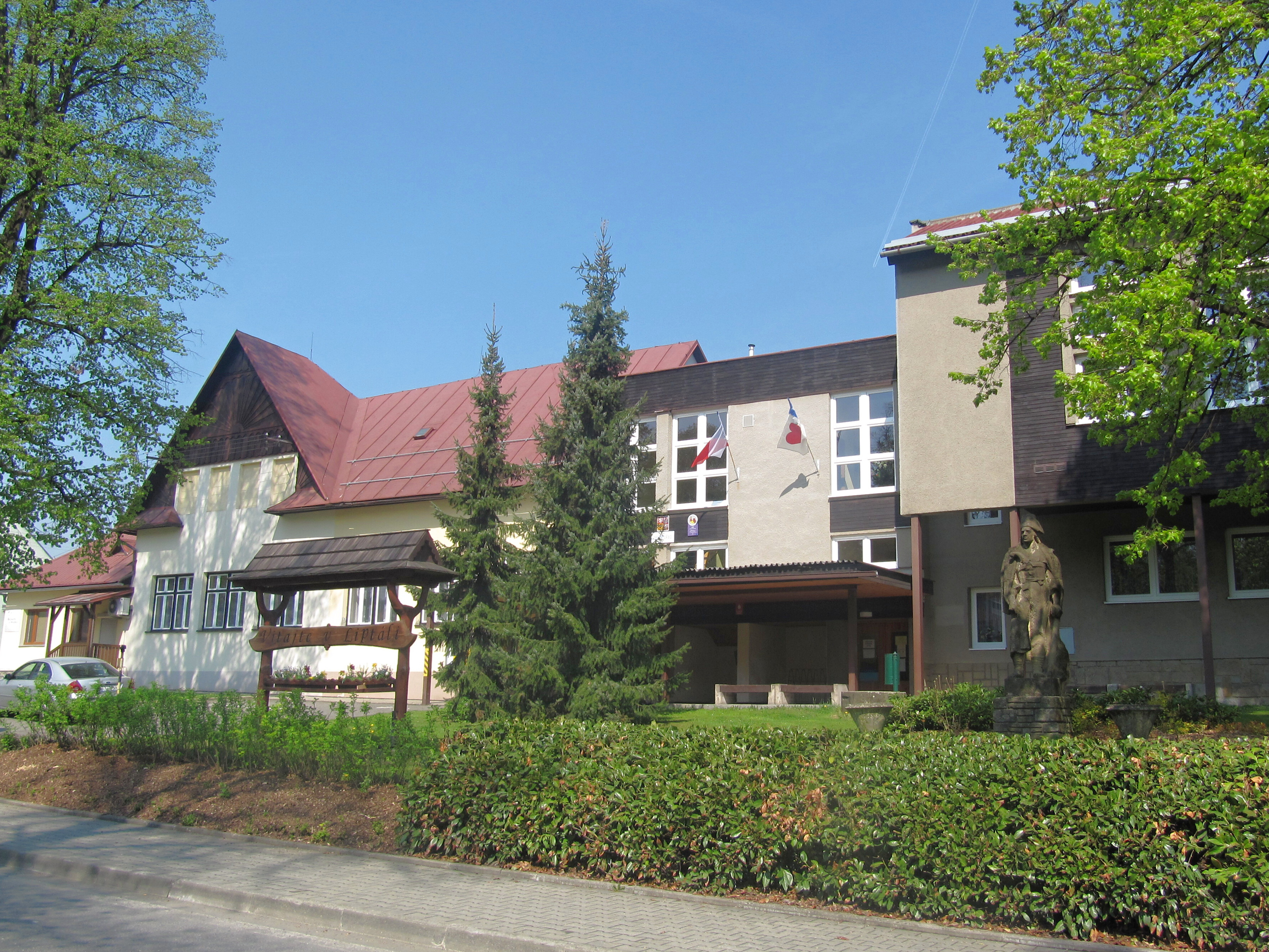
- Municipal office

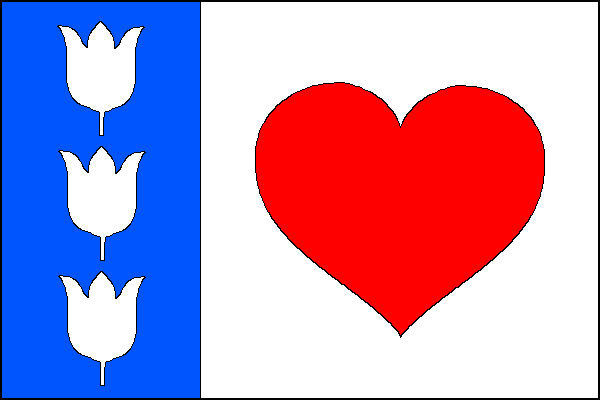
- Flag Coat of arms

- Location in the Czech Republic
- Coordinates: 49°17′26″N 17°55′18″E
- Country: Czech Republic
- Region: Zlín
- District: Vsetín
- First mentioned: 1361

Area
  - Total: 24.12 km^{2} (9.31 sq mi)
- Elevation: 428 m (1,404 ft)

Population (2026-01-01)
  - Total: 1,547
  - Density: 64.14/km^{2} (166.1/sq mi)
- Time zone: UTC+1 (CET)
  - Summer (DST): UTC+2 (CEST)
- Postal code: 756 31
- Website: liptal.cz

Liptál is a municipality and village in Vsetín District in the Zlín Region of the Czech Republic. It has about 1,500 inhabitants.

Liptál lies approximately 8 kilometres (5 mi) south-west of Vsetín, 20 km (12 mi) east of Zlín, and 267 km (166 mi) east of Prague.

== Demographics ==
Historical population
Year	Pop.	±%
1869	1,548	—
1880	1,689	+9.1%
1890	1,678	−0.7%
1900	1,715	+2.2%
1910	1,859	+8.4%
1921	1,718	−7.6%
1930	1,642	−4.4%
1950	1,445	−12.0%
1961	1,547	+7.1%
1970	1,503	−2.8%
1980	1,429	−4.9%
1991	1,394	−2.4%
2001	1,409	+1.1%
2011	1,413	+0.3%
2021	1,477	+4.5%
Source: Censuses

== Twin towns – sister cities ==
Liptál is twinned with:

- Cañas, Costa Rica
- Tilarán, Costa Rica
