= History of the Jews in Hungary =

Hungarian Jews יהדות הונגריה Magyar zsidók
- Location of Hungary (dark green) in the European Union

Total population
- 152,023 (total estimated for Hungary + Israel, does not include other countries)

Regions with significant populations
- Hungary 48,600 (core population, estimation) (2010); 120,000 (estimated population) (2012); 10,965 (self-identifying Jews by religion, 2011 census); Israel 32,023 (immigrants to Israel) (2010)

Languages
- Hungarian; Hebrew; Yiddish

Related ethnic groups
- Ashkenazi Jews/Sephardic Jews

The history of the Jews in Hungary dates back to at least the Kingdom of Hungary, with some records even predating the Hungarian conquest of the Carpathian Basin in 895 CE by over 600 years. Written sources prove that Jewish communities lived in the medieval Kingdom of Hungary and it is even assumed that several sections of the heterogeneous Hungarian tribes practiced Judaism. Jewish officials served the king during the early 13th century reign of Andrew II. From the second part of the 13th century, the general religious tolerance decreased and Hungary's policies became similar to the treatment of the Jewish population in Western Europe.

The Ashkenazi of Hungary were fairly well integrated into Hungarian society by the time of the First World War. By the early 20th century, the community had grown to constitute 5% of Hungary's total population and 23% of the population of the capital, Budapest. Jews became prominent in science, the arts and business. (Note: "By 1941, over 17 percent of Budapest's Jews (as defined by law) belonged to Christian denominations. The number of converts was so great and the influence of some of them so weighty that the Catholic episcopate created an association for their legal and social protection --- the Holy Cross Society – in October 1938. It battled officials over enforcement of the racial laws, campaigned against further legislation, and, later, tried to help converts who were drafted into labor battalions.")

Anti-Jewish policies grew more repressive in the interwar period as Hungary's leaders, who remained committed to regaining the territories lost at the peace agreement (Treaty of Trianon) of 1920, chose to align themselves with the governments of Nazi Germany and Fascist Italy – the international actors most likely to stand behind Hungary's claims. Starting in 1938, Hungary under Miklós Horthy passed a series of anti-Jewish measures in emulation of Germany's Nürnberg Laws. By 1941, over 17% of Budapest's Jews had converted to the Catholic Church. Following the German occupation of Hungary on March 19, 1944, Jews from the provinces were deported to the Auschwitz concentration camp; between May and July that year, 437,000 Jews were sent there from Hungary, most of them gassed on arrival.

The 2011 Hungary census data had 10,965 people (0.11%) who self-identified as religious Jews, of whom 10,553 (96.2%) declared themselves as ethnic Hungarian. Estimates of Hungary's Jewish population in 2010 range from 54,000 to more than 130,000 mostly concentrated in Budapest. There are many active synagogues in Hungary, including the Dohány Street Synagogue, the largest synagogue in Europe and the second largest synagogue in the world after Temple Emanu-El of New York.

== Early history ==
=== Before 1095 ===
It is not definitely known when Jews first settled in Hungary. According to tradition, King Decebalus (ruled Dacia 87–106 CE) permitted the Jews who aided him in his war against Rome to settle in his territory. Dacia included part of modern-day Hungary as well as Romania and Moldova and smaller areas of Bulgaria, Ukraine, and Serbia. Prisoners of the Jewish-Roman Wars may have been brought back by the victorious Roman legions normally stationed in Provincia Pannonia (Western Hungary). Marcus Aurelius ordered the transfer of some of his rebellious troops from Syria to Pannonia in 175 CE. These troops had been recruited partly in Antioch and Hemesa (now Homs), which still had a sizable Jewish population at that time. The Antiochian troops were transferred to Ulcisia Castra (today Szentendre), while the Hemesian troops settled in Intercisa (Dunaújváros).

According to Raphael Patai, stone inscriptions referring to Jews were found in Brigetio (now Szőny), Solva (Esztergom), Aquincum (Budapest), Intercisa (Dunaújváros), Triccinae (Sárvár), Dombovár, Siklós, Sopianae (Pécs) and Savaria (Szombathely). A Latin inscription, the epitaph of Septima Maria, discovered in Siklós (southern Hungary near Croatian border), clearly refers to her Jewishness ("Judaea"). The Intercisa tablet was inscribed on behalf of "Cosmius, chief of the Spondilla customhouse, archisynagogus Iudeorum [head of the synagogue of the Jews]" during the reign of Alexander Severus. In 2008, a team of archeologists discovered a 3rd-century AD amulet in the form of a gold scroll with the words of the Jewish prayer Shema' Yisrael inscribed on it in Féltorony (now Halbturn, Burgenland, in Austria). Hungarian tribes settled the territory 650 years later. In the Hungarian language, the word for Jew is zsidó, which was adopted from one of the Slavic languages.

The first historical document relating to the Jews of Hungary is the letter written about 960 CE to King Joseph of the Khazars by Hasdai ibn Shaprut, the Jewish statesman of Córdoba, in which he says that the Slavic ambassadors promised to deliver the message to the King of Slavonia, who would hand the same to Jews living in "the country of Hungarin", who, in turn, would transmit it farther. About the same time Ibrahim ibn Jacob says that Jews went from Hungary to Prague for business purposes. Nothing is known concerning the Jews during the period of the grand princes, except that they lived in the country and engaged in commerce there.

In 1061, King Béla I ordered that markets should take place on Saturdays instead of the traditional Sundays (Hungarian language has preserved the previous custom, "Sunday" = vasárnap, lit. "market day"). In the reign of St. Ladislaus (1077–1095), the Synod of Szabolcs decreed (20 May 1092) that Jews should not be permitted to have Christian wives or to keep Christian slaves. This decree had been promulgated in the Christian countries of Europe since the 5th century, and St. Ladislaus merely introduced it into Hungary.

The Jews of Hungary at first formed small settlements, and had no learned rabbis; but they were strictly observant of all the Jewish laws and customs. One tradition relates the story of Jews from Ratisbon (Regensburg) coming into Hungary with merchandise from Russia, on a Friday; the wheel of their wagon broke near Buda (Ofen) or Esztergom (Gran) and by the time they had repaired it and had entered the town, the Jews were just leaving the synagogue. The unintentional Sabbath-breakers were heavily fined. The ritual of the Hungarian Jews faithfully reflected contemporary German customs.

=== 1095–1349 ===
Coloman (1095–1116), the successor of St. Ladislaus, renewed the Szabolcs decree of 1092, adding further prohibitions against the employment of Christian slaves and domestics. He also restricted the Jews to cities with episcopal sees – probably to have them under the continuous supervision of the Church. Soon after the promulgation of this decree, Crusaders came to Hungary; but the Hungarians did not sympathize with them, and Coloman even opposed them. The infuriated Crusaders attacked some cities, and if Gedaliah ibn Yaḥya is to be believed, the Jews suffered a fate similar to that of their coreligionists in France, Germany, and Bohemia.

The cruelties inflicted upon the Jews of Bohemia induced many of them to seek refuge in Hungary. It was probably the immigration of the rich Bohemian Jews that induced Coloman soon afterward to regulate commercial and banking transactions between Jews and Christians. He decreed, among other regulations, that if a Christian borrowed from a Jew, or a Jew from a Christian, both Christian and Jewish witnesses must be present at the transaction.

During the reign of King Andrew II (1205–1235) there were Jewish Chamberlains and mint-, salt-, and tax-officials. The nobles of the country, however, induced the king, in his Golden Bull (1222), to deprive the Jews of these high offices. When Andrew needed money in 1226, he farmed the royal revenues to Jews, which gave ground for much complaint. The pope (Pope Honorius III) thereupon excommunicated him, until, in 1233, he promised the papal ambassadors on oath that he would enforce the decrees of the Golden Bull directed against the Jews and the Saracens (by this time, the papacy had changed, and the Pope was now Pope Gregory IX; he would cause both peoples to be distinguished from Christians by means of badges; and would forbid both Jews and Saracens to buy or to keep Christian slaves.

The year 1240 was the closing one of the fifth millennium of the Jewish era. At that time the Jews were expecting the advent of their Messiah. The Mongol invasion in 1241 seemed to conform to expectation, as Jewish imagination expected the happy Messianic period to be ushered in by the war of Gog and Magog. Béla IV (1235–1270) appointed a Jewish man named Henul to the office of court chamberlain (Teka had filled this office under Andrew II); and Wölfel and his sons Altmann and Nickel held the castle at Komárom with its domains in pawn. Béla also entrusted the Jews with the mint; and Hebrew coins of this period are still found in Hungary. In 1251 a privilegium was granted by Béla to his Jewish subjects which was essentially the same as that granted by Duke Frederick II the Quarrelsome to the Austrian Jews in 1244, but which Béla modified to suit the conditions of Hungary. This privilegium remained in force down to the Battle of Mohács (1526).

At the Synod of Buda (1279), held in the reign of King Ladislaus IV of Hungary (1272–1290), it was decreed, in the presence of the papal ambassador Philip of Fermo, that every Jew appearing in public should wear on the left side of his upper garment a piece of red cloth; that any Christian transacting business with a Jew not so marked, or living in a house or on land together with any Jew, should be refused admittance to the Church services; and that a Christian entrusting any office to a Jew should be excommunicated. Andrew III (1291–1301), the last king of the Árpád dynasty, declared, in the privilegium granted by him to the community of Posonium (Bratislava), that the Jews in that city should enjoy all the liberties of citizens.

== Expulsion, readmission and persecution (1349–1526) ==
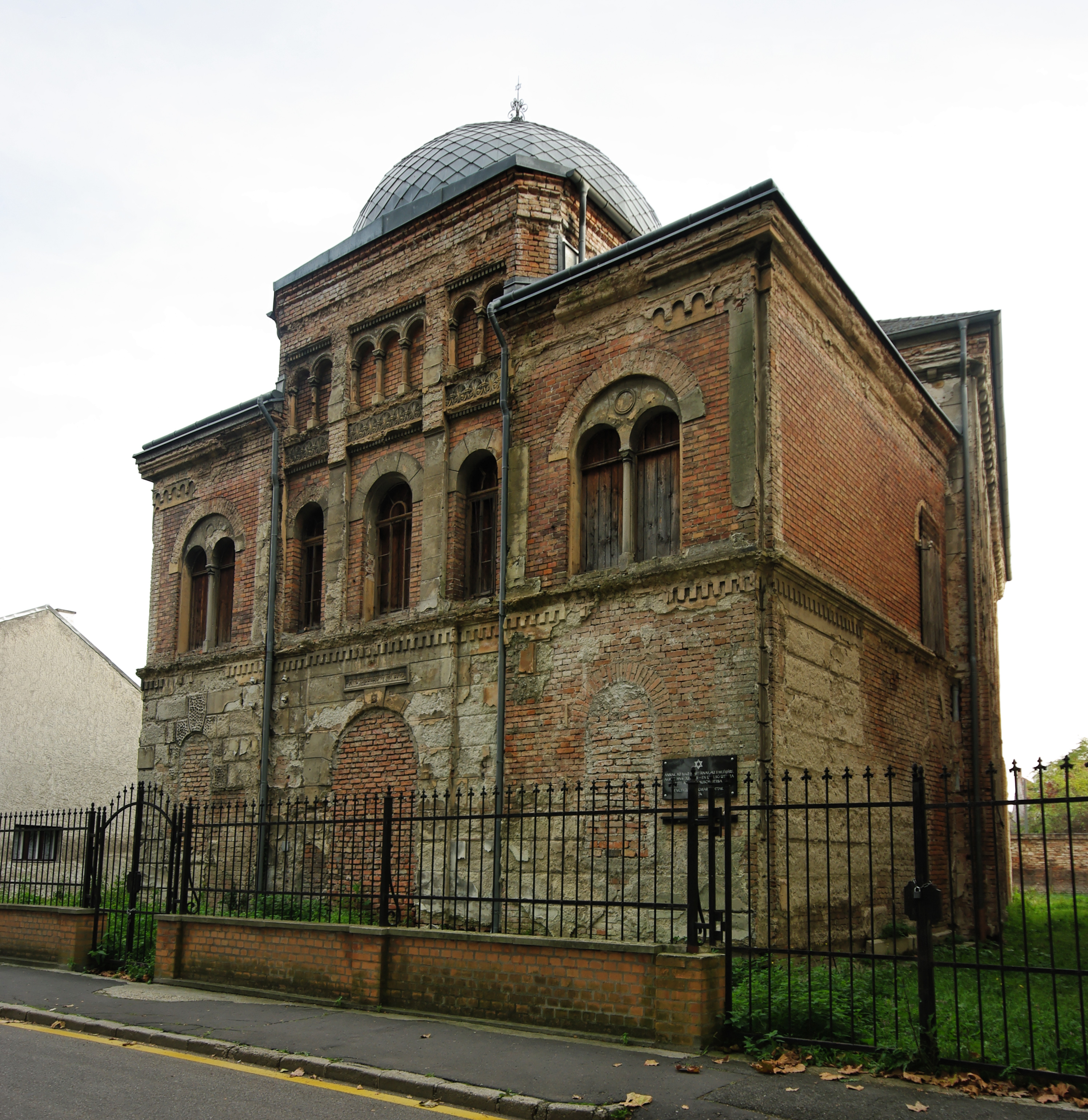
The Orthodox Synagogue of Sopron, Hungary, dates from the 1890s.

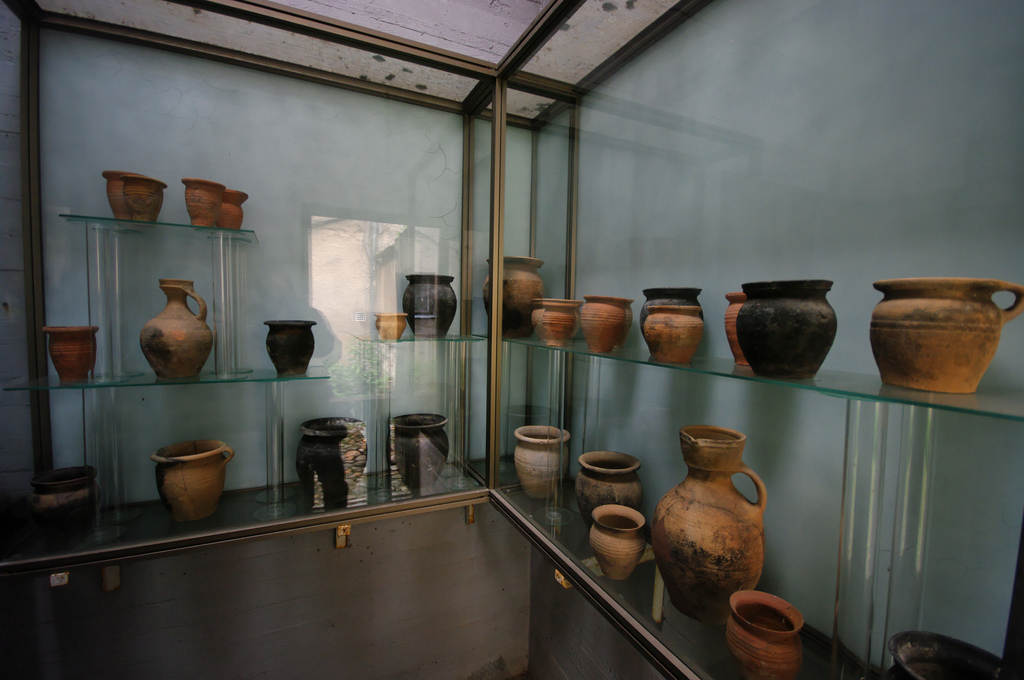
Medieval pottery artifacts inside the Sopron Synagogue Museum.

Under the rule of the foreign kings who occupied the throne of Hungary on the extinction of the house of Arpad, the Hungarian Jews were subjected to many persecutions. During the time of the Black Death (1349), they were expelled from the country. Even though the Jews were immediately readmitted, they were persecuted again, and in 1360, they were expelled by King Louis the Great of Anjou (1342–1382). Although King Louis had initially shown tolerance to the Jews during the early years of his reign, following his conquest of Bosnia, during which he tried to force the local population to convert from the "heretic" Bogomil Christianity to Catholicism, King Louis attempted to impose conversion on Hungarian Jews as well. However, he failed in his attempt to convert them to Catholicism, and expelled them. They were received by Alexander the Good of Moldavia and Dano I of Wallachia, the latter who afforded them special commercial privileges.

Some years later, when Hungary was in financial distress, the Jews were readmitted. They learned that during their absence, the king had introduced the custom of Tödtbriefe, i.e., cancelling by a stroke of his pen, on the request of a subject or a city, the notes and mortgage-deeds of the Jews. An important office which was created by Louis was the office of the "judge of all the Jews living in Hungary," who was chosen from among the dignitaries of the country, the palatines, and treasurers, and he was aided by a deputy. It was his duty to collect taxes from the Jews, protect their privileges, and listen to their complaints, which had become more frequent since the reign of Sigismund Luxembourg (1387–1437).

The successors of Sigismund: Albert (1437–1439), Ladislaus Posthumus (1453–1457), and Matthias Corvinus (1458–1490) all likewise confirmed the privilegium of Béla IV. Matthias created the office of Jewish prefect in Hungary. The period following the death of Matthias was a sad one for the Hungarian Jews. He was hardly buried, when the people fell upon them, confiscated their property, refused to pay debts owing to them, and persecuted them generally. The pretender John Corvinus, Matthias' illegitimate son, expelled them from Tata, and King Ladislaus II (1490–1516), always in need of money, laid heavy taxes upon them. During his reign, Jews were for the first time burned at the stake, many being executed at Nagyszombat (Trnava) in 1494, on suspicion of ritual murder.

For protection, the Hungarian Jews applied to the Holy Roman Emperor Maximilian. On the occasion of the marriage of Louis II and the archduchess Maria (1512), the emperor, with the consent of Ladislaus, took the prefect, Jacob Mendel of Buda, together with his family and all the other Hungarian Jews, under his protection, according to them all the rights enjoyed by his other subjects. Under Ladislaus' successor, Louis II (1516–1526), persecution of the Jews was a common occurrence. The bitter feeling against them was in part augmented by the fact that the baptized Emerich Szerencsés, the deputy treasurer, embezzled the public funds.

== War against the Ottomans (1526–1686) ==
The Ottomans vanquished the Hungarians at the Battle of Mohács (29 August 1526), on which occasion Louis II lost his life on the battlefield. When the news of his death reached the capital, Buda, the court and the nobles fled together with some wealthy Jews, among them the prefect. When the grand vizier, Ibrahim Pasha, preceding Sultan Suleiman I, arrived with his army at Buda, the representatives of the Jews who had remained in the city appeared garbed in mourning before him, and, begging for grace, handed him the keys of the deserted and unprotected castle in token of submission. The sultan himself entered Buda on September 11; and on September 22 he decreed that all the Jews seized at Buda, Esztergom, and elsewhere, more than 2,000 in number, should be distributed among the cities of the Ottoman Empire. They were sent to Constantinople, Plevna (Pleven) and Sofia, where they maintained their separate community for several decades. In Sofia, there existed four Jewish communities in the second half of the 16th century: Romaniote, Ashkenazi, Sephardi and "Ungarus". The overflow of Hungarian Jews from Sofia also settled in Kavala later.

Although the Ottoman Army turned back after the battle, in 1541 it again invaded Hungary to help repel an Austrian attempt to take Buda. By the time the Ottoman Army arrived, the Austrians were defeated, but the Ottomans seized Buda by ruse.

While some of the Jews of Hungary were deported to Anatolia, others, who had fled at the approach of the sultan, sought refuge beyond the frontier or in the free royal towns of western Hungary. The widow of Louis II, the queen regent Maria, favored the enemies of the Jews. The citizens of Sopron (Ödenburg) began hostilities by expelling the Jews of that city, confiscating their property, and pillaging the vacated houses and the synagogue. The city of Pressburg (Bratislava) also received permission from the queen (9 October 1526) to expel the Jews living within its territory, because they had expressed their intention of fleeing before the Turks. The Jews left Pressburg on November 9.

On that same day the diet at Székesfehérvár was opened, at which János Szapolyai (1526–1540) was elected and crowned king in opposition to Ferdinand. During this session it was decreed that the Jews should immediately be expelled from every part of the country. Zápolya, however, did not ratify these laws; and the Diet held at Pressburg in December 1526, at which Ferdinand of Habsburg was chosen king (1526–1564), annulled all the decrees of that of Székesfehérvár, including Zápolya's election as king.

As the lord of Bösing (Pezinok) was in debt to the Jews, a blood accusation was brought against these inconvenient creditors in 1529. Although Mendel, the prefect, and the Jews throughout Hungary protested, the accused were burned at the stake. For centuries afterward Jews were forbidden to live at Bösing. The Jews of Nagyszombat (Trnava) soon shared a similar fate, being first punished for alleged ritual murder and then expelled from the city (19 February 1539).

The Jews living in the parts of Hungary occupied by the Ottoman Empire were treated far better than those living under the Habsburgs. During the periods of 1546–1590 and 1620–1680, the community of Ofen (Buda) flourished.

The following table shows the number of Jewish jizya-tax paying heads of household in Buda during Ottoman rule:

1546	1559	1562	1590	1627	1633	1660
50	44	49	109	11	20	80

At the end of the Ottoman era, the approximately one thousand Jews living in Buda worshipped in three synagogues: an Ashkenazi, a Sephardi and a Syrian one.

While the Ottomans held sway in Hungary, the Jews of Transylvania (at that time an independent principality) also fared well. At the instance of Abraham Sassa, a Jewish physician of Constantinople, Prince Gabriel Bethlen of Transylvania granted a letter of privileges (18 June 1623) to the Spanish Jews from Anatolia. But the community of Judaizing Szekler Sabbatarians, which had existed in Transylvania since 1588, was persecuted and driven underground in 1638.

On 26 November 1572, King Maximilian II (1563–1576) intended to expel the Jews of Pressburg (Bratislava), stating that his edict would be recalled only in case they accepted Christianity. The Jews, however, remained in the city, without abandoning their religion. They were in constant conflict with the citizens. On 1 June 1582 the municipal council decreed that no one should harbor Jews, or even transact business with them. The feeling against the Jews in that part of the country not under Turkish rule is shown by the decree of the Diet of 1578, to the effect that Jews were to be taxed double the amount which was imposed upon other citizens.

By article XV of the law promulgated by the Diet of 1630, Jews were forbidden to take charge of the customs; and this decree was confirmed by the Diet of 1646 on the ground that the Jews were excluded from the privileges of the country, that they were unbelievers, and had no conscience (veluti jurium regni incapaces, infideles, et nulla conscientia praediti). The Jews had to pay a special war-tax when the imperial troops set out toward the end of the 16th century to recapture Buda from the Ottomans. The Buda community suffered much during this siege, as did also that of Székesfehérvár when the imperial troops took that city in September 1601; many of its members were either slain or taken prisoner and sold into slavery, their redemption being subsequently effected by the German, Italian, and Ottoman Jews. After the conclusion of peace, which the Jews helped to bring about, the communities were in part reconstructed; but further development in the territory of the Habsburgs was arrested when Leopold I (1657–1705) expelled the Jews (24 April 1671). He, however, revoked his decree a few months later (August 20). During the siege of Vienna, in 1683, the Jews that had returned to that city were again maltreated. The Ottomans plundered some communities in western Hungary, and deported the members as slaves.

== Habsburg rule ==
=== Further persecution and expulsions (1686–1740) ===
The imperial troops recaptured Buda on 2 September 1686, most Jewish residents were massacred, some captured and later released for ransom. In the following years the whole of Hungary now came under the rule of the House of Habsburg. As the devastated country had to be repopulated, Bishop Count Leopold Karl von Kollonitsch, subsequently Archbishop of Esztergom and Primate of Hungary, advised the king to give the preference to the German Catholics so that the country might in time become German and Catholic. He held that the Jews could not be exterminated at once, but they must be weeded out by degrees, as bad coin is gradually withdrawn from circulation. The decree passed by the Diet of Pressburg (1687–1688), imposing double taxation upon the Jews. Jews were not permitted to engage in agriculture, nor to own any real estate, nor to keep Christian servants.

This advice soon bore fruit and was in part acted upon. In August 1690, the government at Vienna ordered Sopron to expel its Jews, who had immigrated from the Austrian provinces. The government, desiring to enforce the edict of the last Diet, decreed soon afterward that Jews should be removed from the office of collector. The order proved ineffective, however; and the employment of Jewish customs officials was continued. Even the treasurer of the realm set the example in transgressing the law by appointing (1692) Simon Hirsch as customs farmer at Leopoldstadt (Leopoldov); and at Hirsch's death he transferred the office to Hirsch's son-in-law.

The revolt of the Kuruc, under Francis II Rákóczi, caused much suffering to Hungary's Jews. The Kuruc imprisoned and slew the Jews, who had incurred their anger by siding with the king's party. The Jews of Eisenstadt, accompanied by those of the community of Mattersdorf, sought refuge at Vienna, Wiener-Neustadt, and Forchtenstein; those of Holics (Holíč) and Sasvár (Šaštín) dispersed to Göding (Hodonín); while others, who could not leave their business in this time of distress, sent their families to safe places, and themselves braved the danger. While not many Jews lost their lives during this revolt, it made great havoc in their wealth, especially in Sopron County, where a number of rich Jews were living. The king granted letters of protection to those that had been ruined by the revolt, and demanded satisfaction for those that had been injured; but in return for these favors he commanded the Jews to furnish the sums necessary for suppressing the revolt.

After the restoration of peace the Jews were expelled from many cities that feared their competition; thus Esztergom expelled them in 1712, on the ground that the city which had given birth to St. Stephen must not be desecrated by them. But the Jews living in the country, on the estates of their landlords, were generally left alone.

The lot of the Jews was not improved under the reign of Leopold's son, Charles III (1711–1740). He informed the government (June 28, 1725) that he intended to decrease the number of Jews in his domains, and the government thereupon directed the counties to furnish statistics of the Hebrew inhabitants. In 1726 the king decreed that in the Austrian provinces, from the day of publication of the decree, only one male member in each Jewish family be allowed to marry. This decree, restricting the natural increase of the Jews, materially affected the Jewish communities of Hungary. All the Jews in the Austrian provinces who could not marry there went to Hungary to found families; thus the overflow of Austrian Jews peopled Hungary. These immigrants settled chiefly in the northwestern counties, in Nyitra (Nitra), Pressburg (Bratislava), and Trencsén (Trenčín).

The Moravian Jews continued to live in Hungary as Moravian subjects; even those that went there for the purpose of marrying and settling promised on oath before leaving that they would pay the same taxes as those living in Moravia. In 1734 the Jews of Trencsén bound themselves by a secret oath that in all their communal affairs they would submit to the Jewish court at Ungarisch-Brod (Uherský Brod) only. In the course of time the immigrants refused to pay taxes to the Austrian provinces. The Moravian Jews, who had suffered by the heavy emigration, then brought complaint; and Maria Theresa ordered that all Jewish and Christian subjects that had emigrated after 1740 should be extradited, while those who had emigrated before that date were to be released from their Moravian allegiance.

The government could not, however, check the large immigration; for although strict laws were drafted in 1727, they could not be enforced owing to the good-will of the magnates toward the Jews. The counties either did not answer at all, or sent reports bespeaking mercy rather than persecution.

Meanwhile, the king endeavored to free the mining-towns from the Jews – a work which Leopold I had already begun in 1693. The Jews, however, continued to settle near these towns; they displayed their wares at the fairs; and, with the permission of the court, they even erected a foundry at Ság (Sasinkovo). When King Charles ordered them to leave (March 1727), the royal mandate was in some places ignored; in others the Jews obeyed so slowly that he had to repeat his edict three months later.

=== Maria Theresa (1740–1780) ===
In 1735, another census of the Jews of the country was taken with the view of reducing their numbers. There were at that time 11,621 Jews living in Hungary, of which 2,474 were male heads of families, and fifty-seven were female heads. Of these heads of families 35.31 per cent declared themselves to be Hungarians; the rest had immigrated. Of the immigrants 38.35 per cent came from Moravia, 11.05 per cent from Poland, and 3.07 per cent from Bohemia. The largest Jewish community, numbering 770 persons, was that of Pressburg (Bratislava). Most of the Jews were engaged in commerce or industries, most being merchants, traders, or shopkeepers; only a few pursued agriculture.

During the reign of Queen Maria Theresa (1740–1780), daughter of Charles III, the Jews were expelled from Buda (1746), and the "toleration-tax" was imposed upon the Hungarian Jews. On September 1, 1749, the delegates of the Hungarian Jews, except those from Szatmár County, assembled at Pressburg and met a royal commission, which informed them that they would be expelled from the country if they did not pay this tax. The frightened Jews at once agreed to do so; and the commission then demanded a yearly tax of ƒ50,000. This sum being excessive, the delegates protested; and although the queen had fixed ƒ30,000 as the minimum tax, they were finally able to compromise on the payment of ƒ20,000 a year for a period of eight years. The delegates were to apportion this amount among the districts; the districts, their respective sums among the communities; and the communities, theirs among the individual members.

The queen confirmed this agreement of the commission, except the eight-year clause, changing the period to three years, which she subsequently made five. The agreement, thus ratified by the queen, was brought on November 26 before the courts, which were powerless to relieve the Jews from the payment of this Malkegeld ("queen's money" in Yiddish), as they called it.

The Jews, thus burdened by new taxes, thought the time ripe for taking steps to remove their oppressive disabilities. While still at Presburg the delegates had brought their grievances before the mixed commission that was called delegata in puncto tolerantialis taxae et gravaminum Judeorum commissio mixta. These complaints pictured the distress of the Jews of that time. They were not allowed to live in Croatia and Slavonia, in Baranya and Heves Counties, or in several free royal towns and localities; nor might they visit the markets there. At Stuhlweissenburg (Székesfehérvár) they had to pay a poll-tax of 1 florin, 30 kreutzer if they entered the city during the day, if only for an hour. In many places they might not even stay overnight. They therefore begged permission to settle, or at least to visit the fairs, in Croatia and Slavonia and in those places from which they had been driven in consequence of the jealousy of the Greeks and the merchants.

The Jews also had to pay heavier bridge-and ferry-tolls than the Christians; at Nagyszombat (Trnava) they had to pay three times the ordinary sum, namely, for the driver, for the vehicle, and for the animal drawing the same; and in three villages belonging to the same district they had to pay toll, although there was no toll-gate. Jews living on the estates of the nobles had to give their wives and children as pledges for arrears of taxes. In Upper Hungary they asked for the revocation of the toleration-tax imposed by the chamber of Zips County (Szepes, Spiš), on the ground that otherwise the Jews living there would have to pay two such taxes; and they asked also to be relieved from a similar tax paid to the Diet. Finally, they requested that Jewish artisans might be allowed to follow their trades in their homes undisturbed.

The commission laid these complaints before the Queen, indicating the manner in which they could be relieved; and their suggestions were subsequently willed by the queen and made into law. The queen relieved the Jews from the tax of toleration in Upper Hungary only. In regard to the other complaints she ordered that the Jews should specify them in detail, and that the government should remedy them insofar as they came under its jurisdiction.

The toleration-tax had hardly been instituted when Michael Hirsch petitioned the government to be appointed primate of the Hungarian Jews to be able to settle difficulties that might arise among them, and to collect the tax. The government did not recommend Hirsch, but decided that in case the Jews should refuse to pay, it might be advisable to appoint a primate to adjust the matter.

Before the end of the period of five years the delegates of the Jews again met the commission at Pressburg (Bratislava) and offered to increase the amount of their tax to 25,000 florins a year if the queen would promise that it should remain at that sum for the next ten years. The queen had other plans, however; not only did she dismiss the renewed gravamina of the Jews, but rather imposed stiffer regulations upon them. Their tax of ƒ20,000 was increased to ƒ30,000 in 1760; to ƒ50,000 in 1772; to ƒ80,000 in 1778; and to ƒ160,000 in 1813.

=== Joseph II (1780–1790) ===
Joseph II (1780–1790), son and successor of Maria Theresa, showed immediately on his accession that he intended to alleviate the condition of the Jews, communicating this intention to the Hungarian chancellor, Count Franz Esterházy as early as May 13, 1781. In consequence the Hungarian government issued (March 31, 1783) a decree known as the Systematica gentis Judaicae regulatio, which wiped out at one stroke the decrees that had oppressed the Jews for centuries. The royal free towns, except the mining-towns, were opened to the Jews, who were allowed to settle at leisure throughout the country. The regulatio decreed that the legal documents of the Jews should no longer be composed in Hebrew, or in Yiddish, but in Latin, German, and Hungarian, the languages used in the country at the time, and which the young Jews were required to learn within two years.

Documents written in Hebrew or in Yiddish were not legal; Hebrew books were to be used at worship only; the Jews were to organize elementary schools; the commands of the emperor, issued in the interests of the Jews, were to be announced in the synagogues; and the rabbis were to explain to the people the salutary effects of these decrees. The subjects to be taught in the Jewish schools were to be the same as those taught in the national schools; the same text-books were to be used in all the elementary schools; and everything that might offend the religious sentiment of non-conformists was to be omitted.

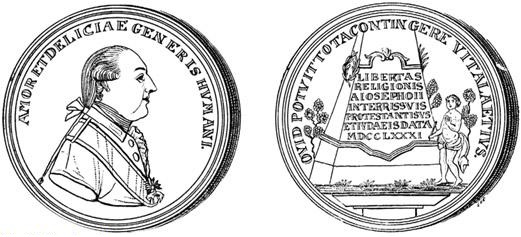
A medal minted during the reign of Josef II, commemorating his grant of religious liberty to Jews and Protestants.

During the early years Christian teachers were to be employed in the Jewish schools, but they were to have nothing to do with the religious affairs of such institutions. After the lapse of ten years a Jew might establish a business, or engage in trade, only if he could prove that he had attended a school. The usual school-inspectors were to supervise the Jewish schools and to report to the government. The Jews were to create a fund for organizing and maintaining their schools. Jewish youth might enter the academies, and might study any subject at the universities except theology. Jews might rent farms only if they could cultivate the same without the aid of Christians.

Jews were allowed to peddle and to engage in various industrial occupations, and to be admitted into the guilds. They were also permitted to engrave seals, and to sell gunpowder and saltpeter; but their exclusion from the mining-towns remained in force. Christian masters were allowed to have Jewish apprentices. All distinctive marks hitherto worn by the Jews were to be abolished, and they might even carry swords. On the other hand, they were required to discard the distinctive marks prescribed by their religion and to shave their beards. Emperor Joseph regarded this decree so seriously that he allowed no one to violate it.

The Jews, in a petition dated April 22, 1783, expressed their gratitude to the emperor for his favors, and, reminding him of his principle that religion should not be interfered with, asked permission to wear beards. The emperor granted the prayer of the petitioners, but reaffirmed the other parts of the decree (April 24, 1783). The Jews organized schools in various places, at Pressburg (Bratislava), Óbuda, Vágújhely (Nové Mesto nad Váhom), and Nagyvárad (Oradea). A decree was issued by the emperor (July 23, 1787) to the effect that every Jew should choose a German surname; and a further edict (1789) ordered, to the consternation of the Jews, that they should henceforth perform military service.

After the death of Joseph II the royal free cities showed a very hostile attitude toward the Jews. The citizens of Pest petitioned the municipal council that after May 1, 1790, the Jews should no longer be allowed to live in the city. The government interfered; and the Jews were merely forbidden to engage in peddling in the city. Seven days previously a decree of expulsion had been issued at Nagyszombat (Trnava), May 1 being fixed as the date of the Jews' departure. The Jews appealed to the government; and in the following December the city authorities of Nagyszombat were informed that the Diet had confirmed the former rights of the Jews, and that the latter could not be expelled.

=== Toleration and oppression (1790–1847) ===
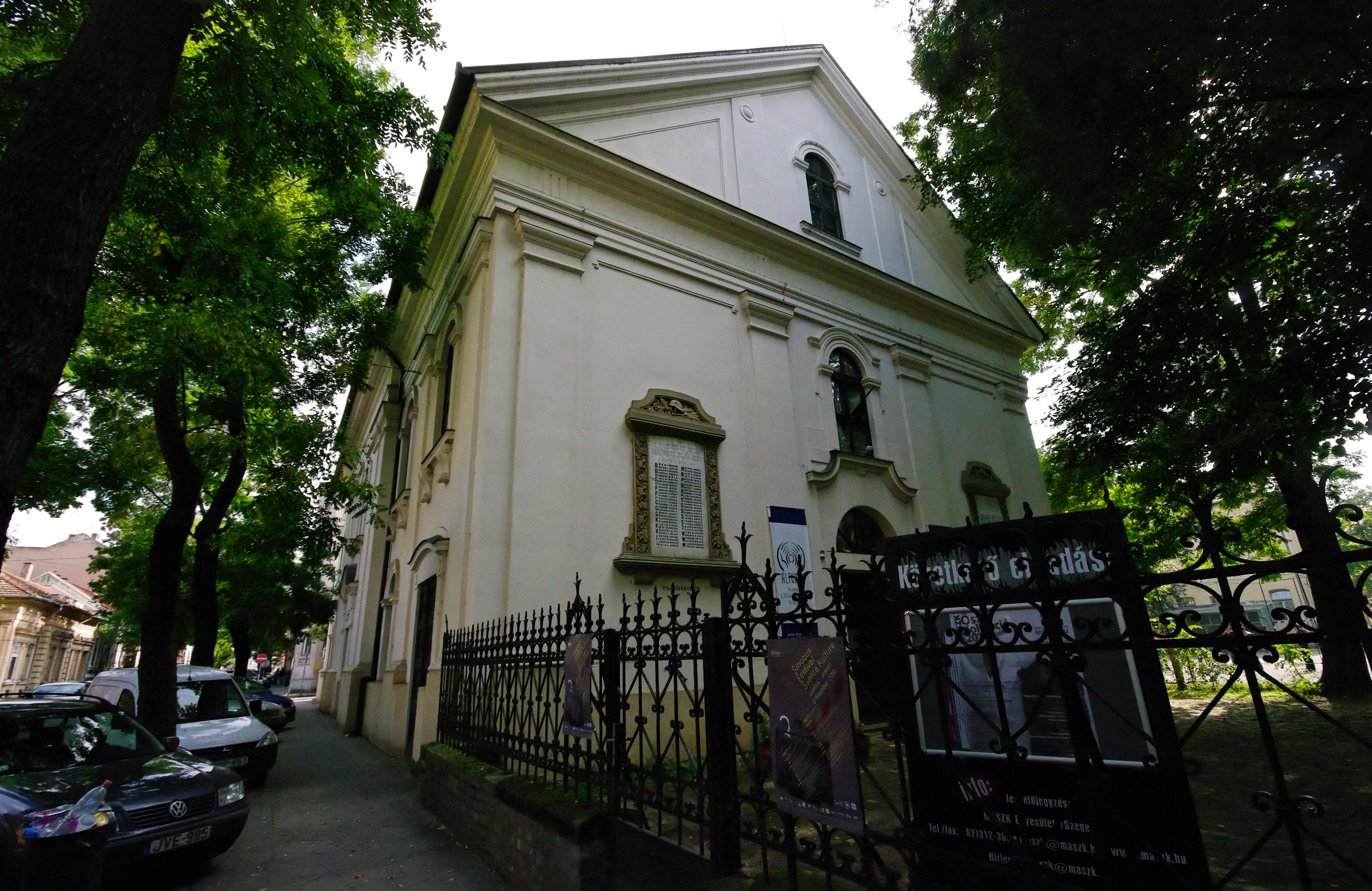
Neoclassical architecture was used for this Synagogue in Szeged.

The Jews of Hungary handed a petition, in which they boldly presented their claims to equality with other citizens, to King Leopold II (1790–1792) at Vienna on November 29, 1790. He sent it the following day to the chancelleries of Hungary and Moravia for their opinions. The question was brought before the estates of the country on December 2, and the Diet drafted a bill showing that it intended to protect the Jews. This decision created consternation among the enemies of the latter. Nagyszombat (Trnava) addressed a further memorandum to the estates (December 4) in which it demanded that the Diet should protect the city's privileges. The Diet decided in favor of the Jews, and its decision was laid before the king.

The Jews, confidently anticipating the king's decision in their favor, organized a splendid celebration on November 15, 1790, the day of his coronation; on January 10, 1791, the king approved the bill of the Diet; and the following law, drafted in conformity with the royal decision, was read by Judge Stephen Atzel in the session of February 5:

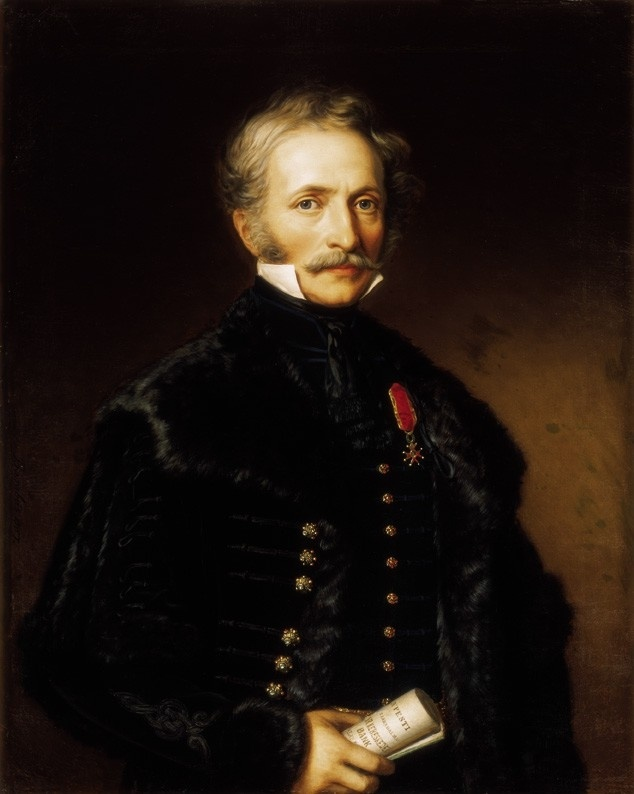
Móric Ullmann (1782–1847), Hungarian Jewish banker, trader, founder of the Pesti Magyar Kereskedelmi Bank (Pesti Hungarian Commercial Bank).

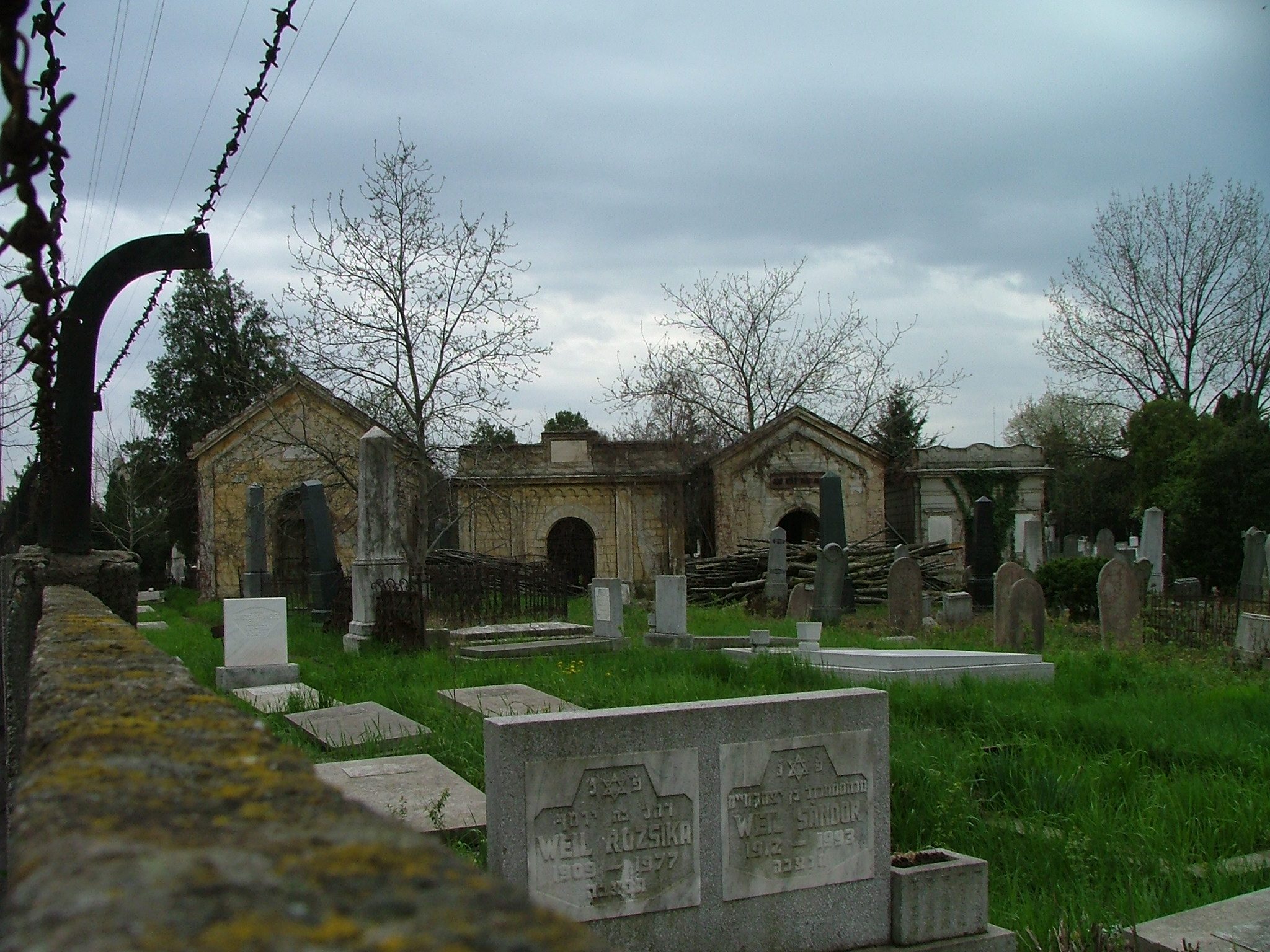
The Jewish Cemetery in the city of Timișoara, now part of Romania.

"In order that the condition of the Jews may be regulated pending such time as may elapse until their affairs and the privileges of various royal free towns relating to them shall have been determined by a commission to report to the next ensuing Diet, when his Majesty and the estates will decide on the condition of the Jews, the estates have determined, with the approval of his Majesty, that the Jews within the boundaries of Hungary and the countries belonging to it shall, in all the royal free cities and in other localities (except the royal mining-towns), remain under the same conditions in which they were on Jan. 1, 1790; and in case they have been expelled anywhere, they shall be recalled."

Thus came into force the famous law entitled De Judaeis, which forms the thirty-eighth article of the laws of the Diet of 1790–1791. The De Judaeis law was gratefully received by the Jews; for it not only afforded them protection, but also gave them the assurance that their affairs would soon be regulated. Still, although the Diet appointed on February 7, 1791, a commission to study the question, the amelioration of the condition of the Hungarian Jews was not effected till half a century later, under Ferdinand V (r. 1835–1848), during the session of the Diet of 1839–1840. It is estimated that the Jewish population in Hungary grew by about 80% between 1815 and 1840, bolstered by immigration due to the perception of royal tolerance.

In consequence of the petition of the Jews of Pest, the mover of which was Philip Jacobovics, superintendent of the Jewish hospital, the general assembly of the county of Pest drafted instructions for the delegates on June 10, 1839, to the effect that if the Jews would be willing to adopt the Magyar language they should be given equal rights with other Hungarian citizens. From now on much attention was paid to the teaching of Hungarian in the schools; Moritz Bloch (Ballagi) translated the Pentateuch into Hungarian, and Moritz Rosenthal the Psalms and the Pirkei Avoth. Various communities founded Hungarian reading-circles; and the Hungarian dress and language were more and more adopted. Many communities began to use Hungarian on their seals and in their documents, and some liberal rabbis even began to preach in that language.

At the sessions of the Diet subsequent to that of 1839–1840, as well as in various cities, a decided antipathy—at times active and at times merely passive—toward the Jews became manifest. In sharp contrast to this attitude was that of Baron József Eötvös, who published in 1840 in the Budapesti Szemle, the most prominent Hungarian review, a strong appeal for the emancipation of the Jews. This cause also found a friend in Count Charles Zay, the chief ecclesiastical inspector of the Hungarian Lutherans, who warmly advocated Jewish interests in 1846.

Although the session of the Diet convened on November 7, 1847, was unfavorable to the Jews, the latter not only continued to cultivate the Hungarian language, but were also willing to sacrifice their lives and property in the hour of danger. During the Revolution of 1848 they displayed their patriotism, even though attacked by the populace in several places at the beginning of the uprising. On March 19 the populace of Pressburg (Bratislava), encouraged by the antipathies of the citizens—who were aroused by the fact that the Jews, leaving their ghetto around Pressburg Castle (Bratislava Castle), were settling in the city itself—began hostilities that were continued after some days, and were renewed more fiercely in April.

At this time the expulsion of the Jews from Sopron, Pécs, Székesfehérvár, and Szombathely was demanded; in the last two cities there were pogroms. At Szombathely, the mob advanced upon the synagogue, cut up the Torah scrolls, and threw them into a well. Nor did the Jews of Pest escape, while those at Vágújhely (Nové Mesto nad Váhom) especially suffered from the brutality of the mob. Bitter words against the Jews were also heard in the Diet. Some Jews advised emigration to America as a means of escape; and a society was founded at Pest, with a branch at Pressburg, for that purpose. A few left Hungary, seeking a new home across the sea, but the majority remained.

== Revolution and emancipation (1848–1849) ==
=== Jews and the Hungarian Revolution ===
Jews entered the national guard as early as March 1848; although they were excluded from certain cities, they reentered as soon as the danger to the country seemed greater than the hatred of the citizens. At Pest the Jewish national guard formed a separate division. When the national guards of Pápa were mobilized against the Croatians, Leopold Löw, rabbi of Pápa, joined the Hungarian ranks, inspiring his companions by his words of encouragement. Jews were also to be found in the volunteer corps, and among the honvéd and landsturm; and they constituted one-third of the volunteer division of Pest that marched along the Drava against the Croatians, being blessed by Rabbi Schwab on June 22, 1848.

Many Jews throughout the country joined the army to fight for their fatherland; among them, Adolf Hübsch, subsequently rabbi at New York City; Solomon Marcus Schiller-Szinessy, afterward lecturer at the University of Cambridge; and Ignatz Einhorn, who, under the name of "Eduard Horn," subsequently became state secretary of the Hungarian Ministry of Commerce. The rebellious Serbians slew the Jews at Zenta who sympathized with Hungary; among them, Rabbi Israel Ullmann and Jacob Münz, son of Moses Münz of Óbuda The conduct of the Jewish soldiers in the Hungarian army was highly commended by Generals Klapka and Görgey. Einhorn estimated the number of Jewish soldiers who took part in the Hungarian Revolution to be 20,000; but this is most likely exaggerated, as Béla Bernstein enumerates only 755 combatants by name in his work, Az 1848-49-iki Magyar Szabadságharcz és a Zsidók (Budapest, 1898).

The Hungarian Jews served their country not only with the sword, but also with funds. Communities and individuals, Chevra Kadisha, and other Jewish societies, freely contributed silver and gold, armor and provisions, clothed and fed the soldiers, and furnished lint and other medical supplies to the Hungarian camps. Meanwhile, they did not forget to take steps to obtain their rights as citizens. When the Diet of 1847–1848 (in which, according to ancient law, only the nobles and those having the rights of nobles might take part) was dissolved (April 11), and the new Parliament – at which under the new laws the delegates elected by the commons also appeared – was convened at Pest (July 2, 1848), the Jews hopefully looked forward to the deliberations of the new body.

=== Brief emancipation and aftermath, 1849 ===
Many Jews thought to pave the way for emancipation by a radical reform of their religious life. They thought this might ease their way, as legislators in the Diets and articles printed in the press suggested that the Jews should not receive equal civic rights until they reformed their religious practices. This reform had been first demanded in the session of 1839–1840. From this session onward, the press and general assemblies pushed for religious reform. Several counties instructed their representatives not to vote for the emancipation of the Jews until they desisted from practising the externals of their religion.

For the purpose of urging Jewish emancipation, all the Jews of Hungary sent delegates to a conference at Pest on July 5, 1848. It chose a commission of ten members to lobby with the Diet for emancipation. The commission delegates were instructed not to make any concessions related to practicing the Jewish faith. The commission soon after addressed a petition to the Parliament for emancipation, but it proved ineffective.

The national assembly at Szeged granted emancipation of Jews on Saturday, the eve of the Ninth of Av (July 28, 1849). The bill, which was quickly debated and immediately became a law, fulfilled the hopes of the Reform party. The Jews obtained full citizenship. The Ministry of the Interior was ordered to call a convention of Jewish ministers and laymen for the purpose of drafting a confession of faith, and of inducing the Jews to organize their religious life in conformity with the demands of the time, for instance, business hours on Saturday, the Jewish Sabbath. The bill included the clause referring to marriages between Jews and Christians, which clause both Lajos Kossuth and the Reform party advocated.

The Jews' civic liberty lasted for just two weeks. After the Hungarian army's surrender at Világos to Russian troops, which had come to aid the Austrians in suppressing the Hungarian struggle for liberty, the Jews were severely punished by new authorities for having taken part in the uprising. Field Marshal Julius Jacob von Haynau, the new governor of Hungary, imposed heavy war-taxes upon them, especially upon the communities of Pest and Óbuda, which had already been heavily taxed by Alfred I, Prince of Windisch-Grätz, commander-in-chief of the Austrian army, on his triumphant entry into the Hungarian capital at the beginning of 1849. Haynau punished the communities of Kecskemét, Nagykőrös, Cegléd, Albertirsa, Szeged, and Szabadka (now Subotica, Serbia) with equal severity. Numerous Jews were imprisoned and executed; others sought refuge in emigration.

Several communities petitioned to be relieved of the war taxes. The ministry of war, however, increased the burden, requiring that the communities of Pest, Óbuda, Kecskemét, Czegléd, Nagykőrös, and Irsa should pay this tax not in kind, but in currency to the amount of ƒ2,300,000 . As the communities were unable to collect such monies, they petitioned the government to remit it. The Jewish communities of the entire country were ordered to share in raising the sum, on the grounds that most of the Jews of Hungary had supported the Revolution. Only the communities of Temesvár (now Timișoara, Romania) and Pressburg (now Bratislava, Slovakia) were exempted from this order, as they remained loyal to the existing Austrian government. The military commission added a clause to tax requirements, to the effect that individuals or communities might be exempted from the punishment, if they could prove by documents or witnesses, before a commission to be appointed, that they had not taken part in the Revolution, either by word or deed, morally or materially. The Jews refused this means of clearing themselves. They declared to be willing to redeem the tax by collecting a certain sum for a national school fund. Emperor Franz Joseph remitted the war-tax (September 20, 1850), but ordered that the Jews of Hungary without distinction should contribute toward a Jewish school fund of ƒ1,000,000; they raised this sum within a few years.

== Struggles for a second emancipation (1859–1867) ==
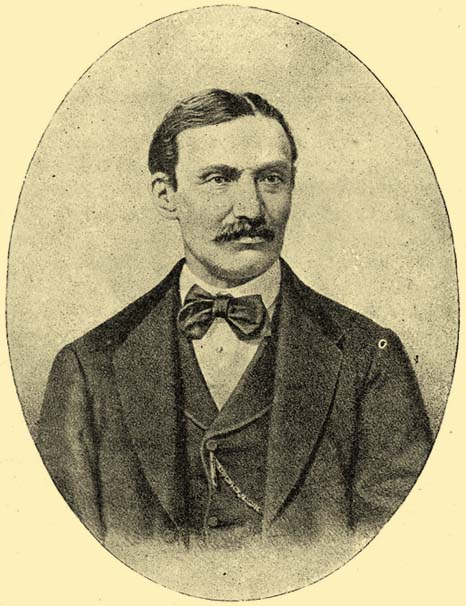
Prominent newspaper editor and journalist Miksa (Maxmilian) Falk returned to Hungary from Vienna following the emancipation in 1867. He was a national-level politician from 1875 to 1905.

While the House of Habsburg controlled Hungary, emancipation of Jews was postponed. When the Austrian troops were defeated in Italy in 1859, activists pressed for liberty. In that year the cabinet, with Emperor Franz Joseph in the chair, decreed that the status of the Jews should be regulated in agreement with the times, but with due regard for the conditions obtaining in the several localities and provinces. When the emperor convened the Diet on April 2, 1861, Jews pushed for emancipation but the early dissolution of that body prevented it from taking action in the matter.

The decade of absolutism in Hungary (1849–1859) resulted in Jews establishing schools, most of which were in charge of trained teachers. Based on the Jewish school fund, the government organized model schools at Sátoraljaújhely, Temesvár (Timișoara), Pécs, and Pest. In Pest the Israelite State Teachers' Seminary was founded in 1859, the principals of which have included Abraham Lederer, Heinrich Deutsch, and József Bánóczi.

After the emancipation was achieved, many Hungarian Jews (especially in the middle and upper classes) openly embraced Hungarian nationalism and supported the Magyarization policies. A notable example is an article in the Jewish magazine Borsszem Jankó from 13 June 1869 (pictured here), criticizing the Mocioni family for their Romanian national activism and opposition against Magyarization.

When the Parliament dissolved in 1861, the emancipation of the Jews was deferred to the coronation of Franz Joseph. On December 22, 1867, the question came before the lower house, and on the favorable report of Kálmán Tisza and Zsigmond Bernáth, a bill in favor of emancipation was adopted; it was passed by the upper house on the following day. Although the Antisemitic Party was represented in the Parliament, it was not taken seriously by the political elite of the country. Its agitation against Jews was not successful (see Tiszaeszlár affair).

On October 4, 1877, the Budapest University of Jewish Studies opened in Budapest. The university is still operating, celebrating its 130th anniversary on October 4, 2007. Since its opening, it has been the only Jewish institute in all of Central and Eastern Europe.

In the 1890 Hungarian census, 64.0% of the Jewish population were counted as ethnic Hungarian by mother tongue, 33.1% as German 1.9% as Slovak, 0.8% as Romanian, and 0.2% as Ruthenian.

== Austria-Hungary (1867–1918) ==
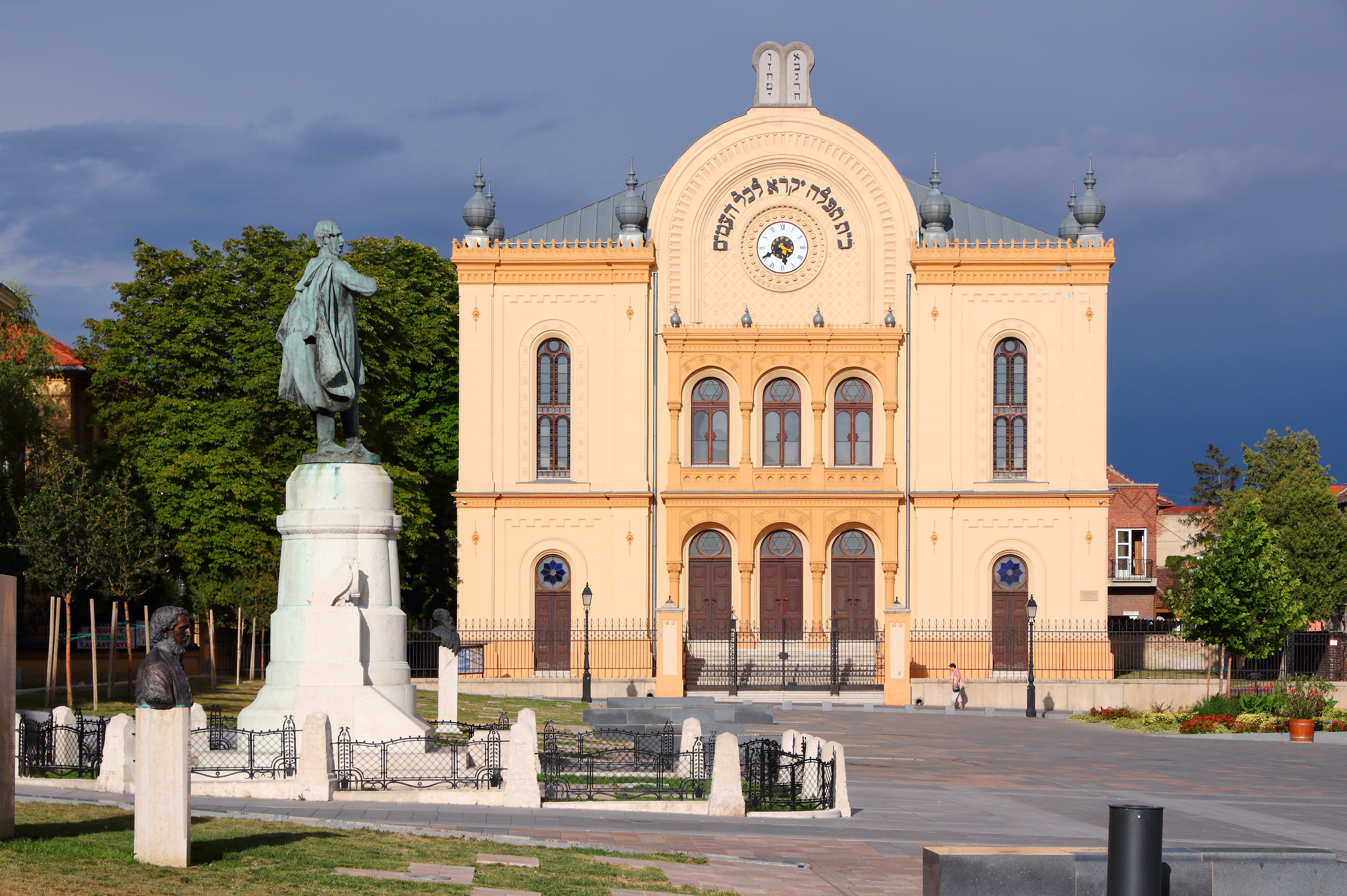
Romantic style Great Synagogue in Pécs, built by Neolog community in 1869.

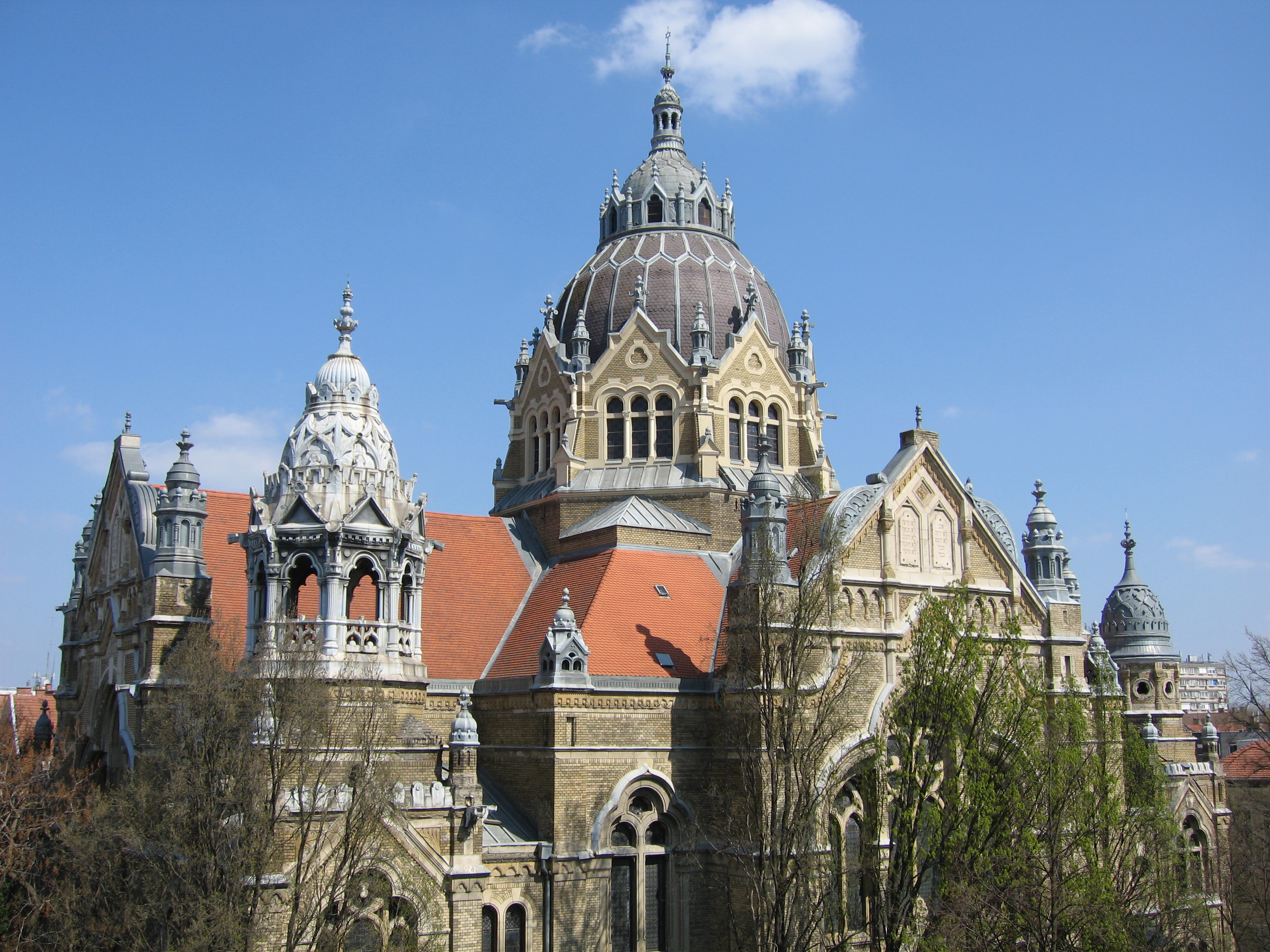
Szeged Synagogue

=== Family names ===
Most Jews did not have family names before 1783. Some family names were recorded for Jewish families:

- 1050: Jászkonti
- 1263: Farkas
- 1350: Hosszú
- 16th century: Cseh, Jakab, Gazdag, Fekete, Nagy, Kis
- 1780: Bárány, Csonka, Horpács, Jónap, Kohányi, Kossuth, Kosztolányi, Lengyel, Lőrincz, Lukács, Szarvas, Szabó, Varga.

Emperor Joseph II believed that Germanization could facilitate the centralization of his empire. Beginning in 1783, he ordered Jews to either choose or be given German family names by local committees. The actions were dependent on local conditions.

With the rise of Hungarian nationalism, the first wave of Magyarization of family names occurred between 1840 and 1849. After the Hungarian revolution, this process was stopped until 1867. After the Ausgleich, many Jews changed their family names from German to Hungarian.

In 1942 during World War II, when Hungary became allied with Germany, the Hungarian Defense Ministry was tasked with "race validation." Its officials complained that no Hungarian or German names were "safe," as Jews might have any name. They deemed Slavic names to be "safer", but the decree listed 58 Slavic-sounding names regularly held by Jews.

=== Population statistics ===
==== 1890 / 1900 / 1910 census summaries ====
	1890	1900	1910
Total population of Hungary, without Croatia	15,162,988	16,838,255	18,264,533
Emigration to the US in the previous decade, '00–'09	164,119	261,444	1,162,271
Jewish population, again without Croatia	707,961	831,162	911,227
Increase of the total population in the previous decade	10.28%	11.05%	8.47%
(Emigration to the US in the previous decade, '00–'09) / population at previous census	1.19%	1.72%	6.90%
Increase of the Jewish population in the previous decade	13.31%	17.40%	9.62%
Jewish/Total	4.67%	4.94%	4.99%

Almost a quarter (22.35%) of the Jews of Hungary lived in Budapest in 1910. Some of the surviving large synagogues in Budapest include the following:

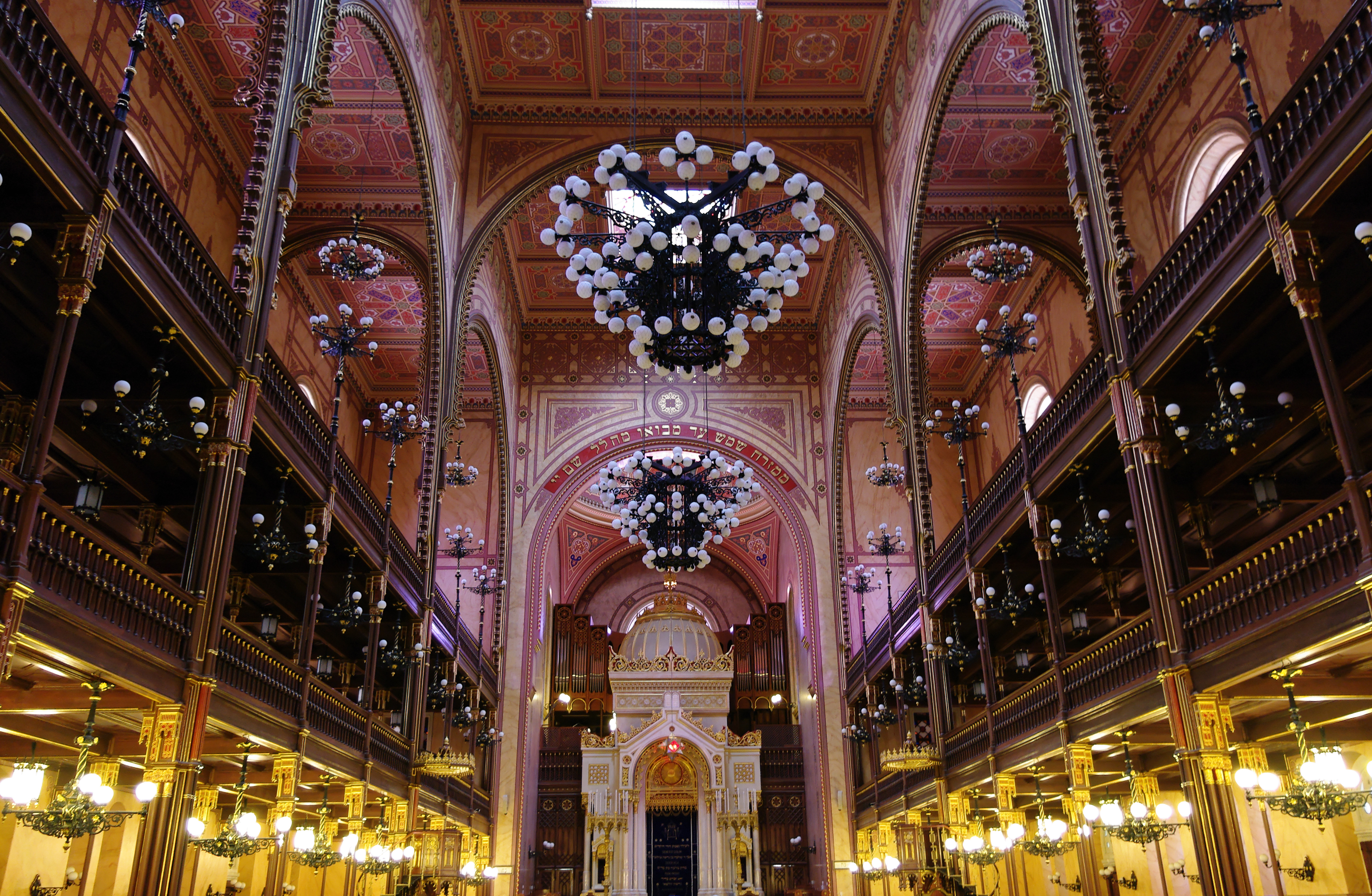
Interior of Dohány Street Synagogue

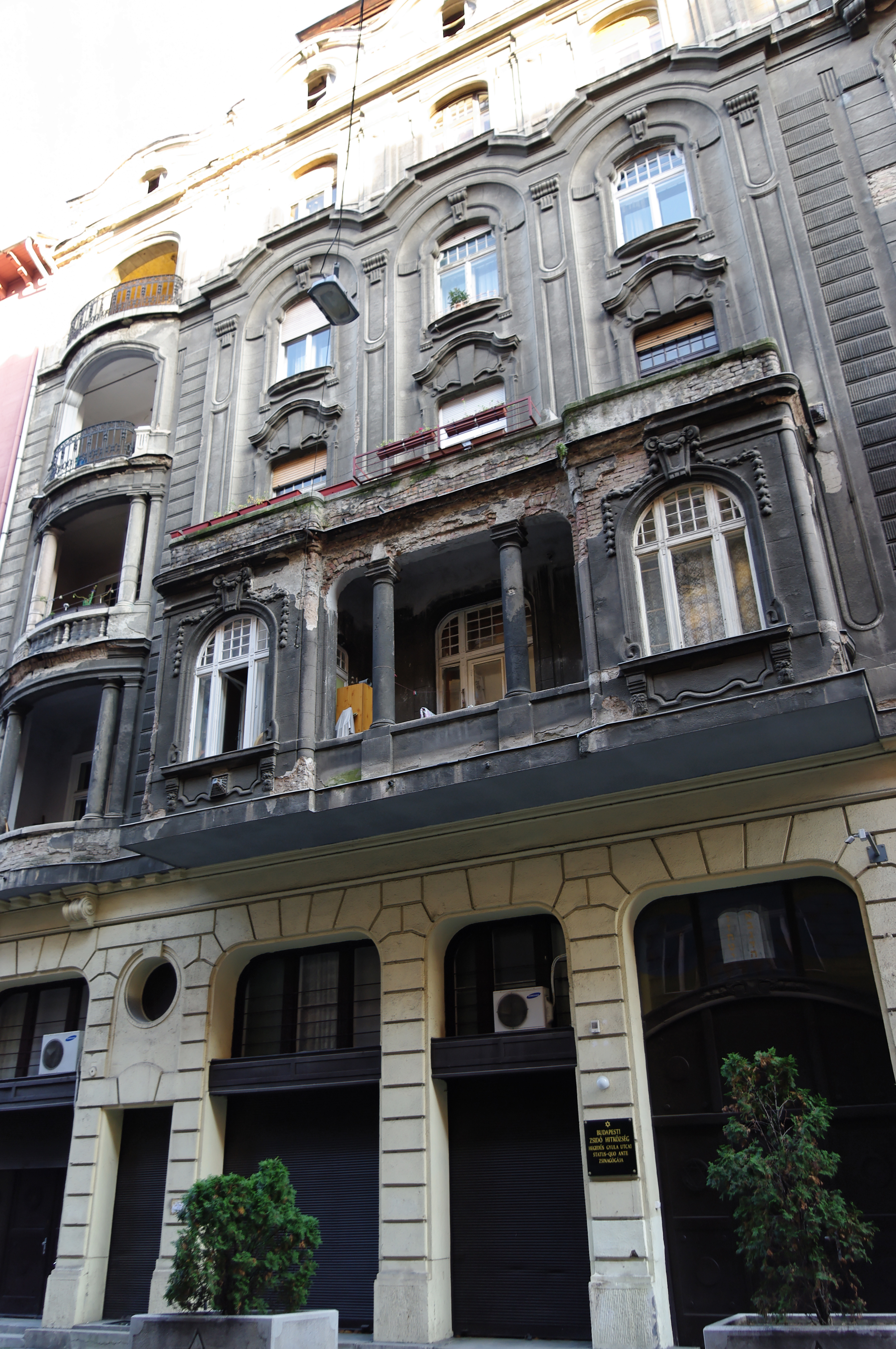
Hegedus Gyula Utca Synagogue

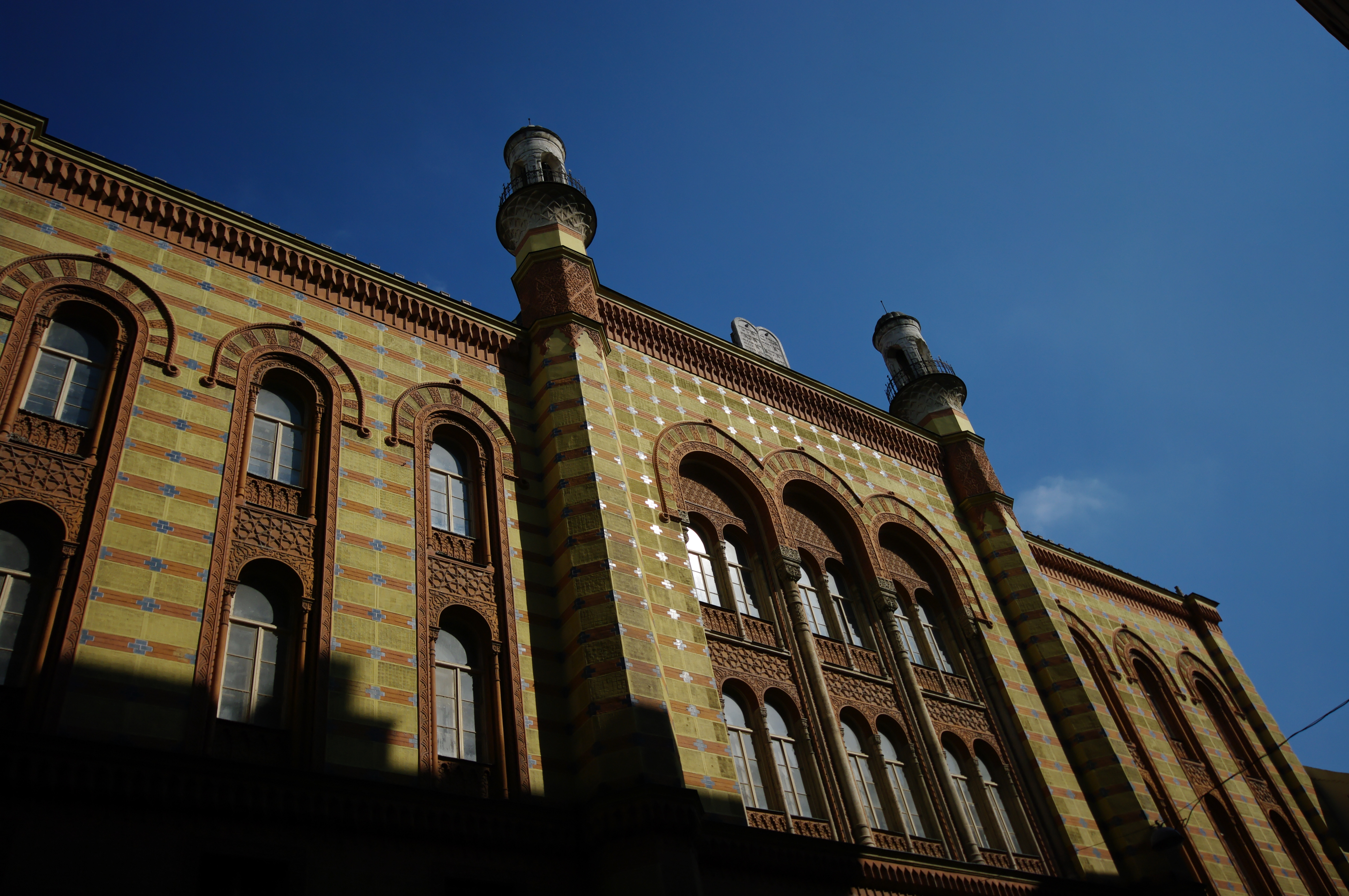
Rumbach Street Synagogue

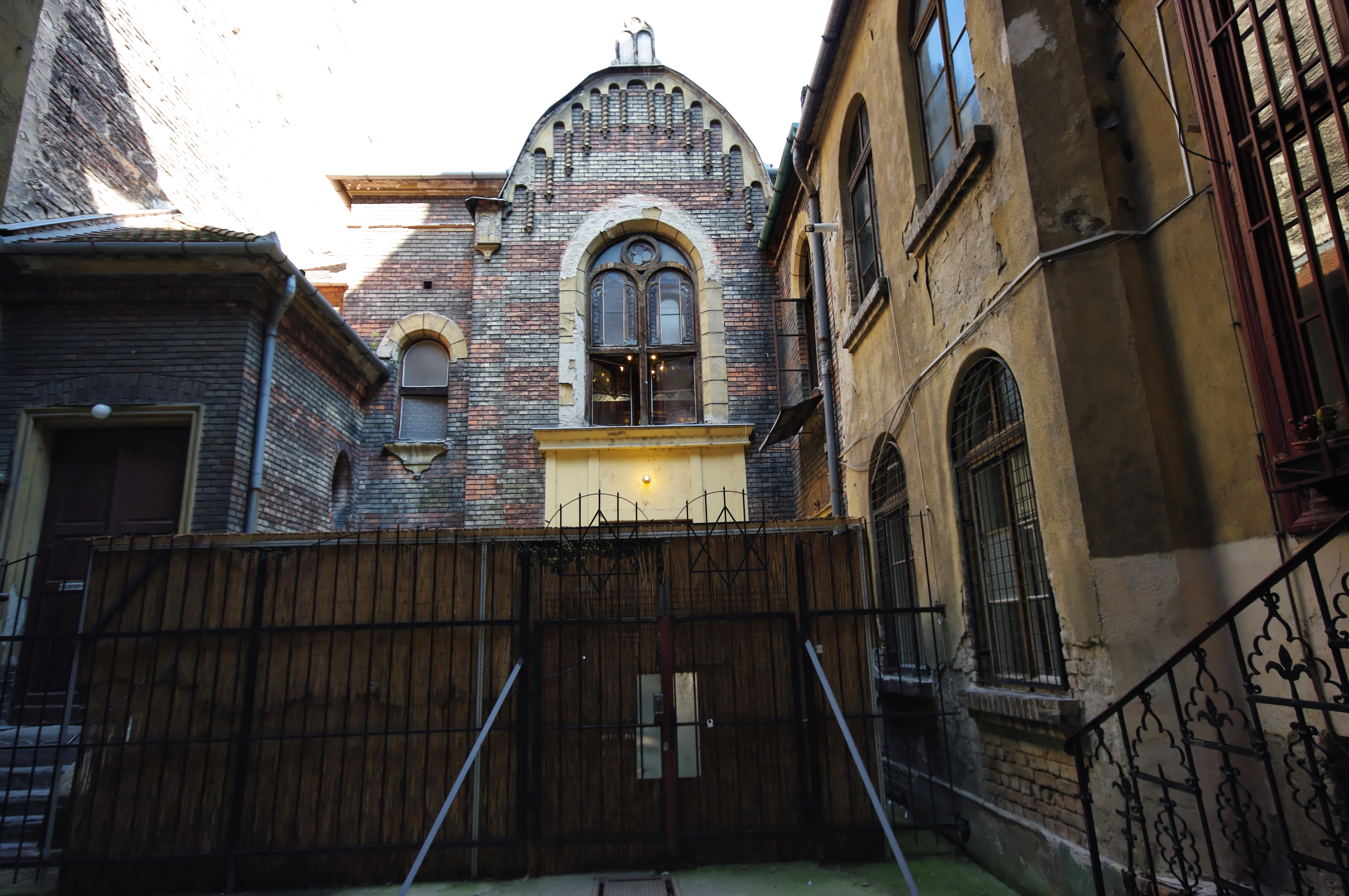
Vasvari Pal Street Synagogue

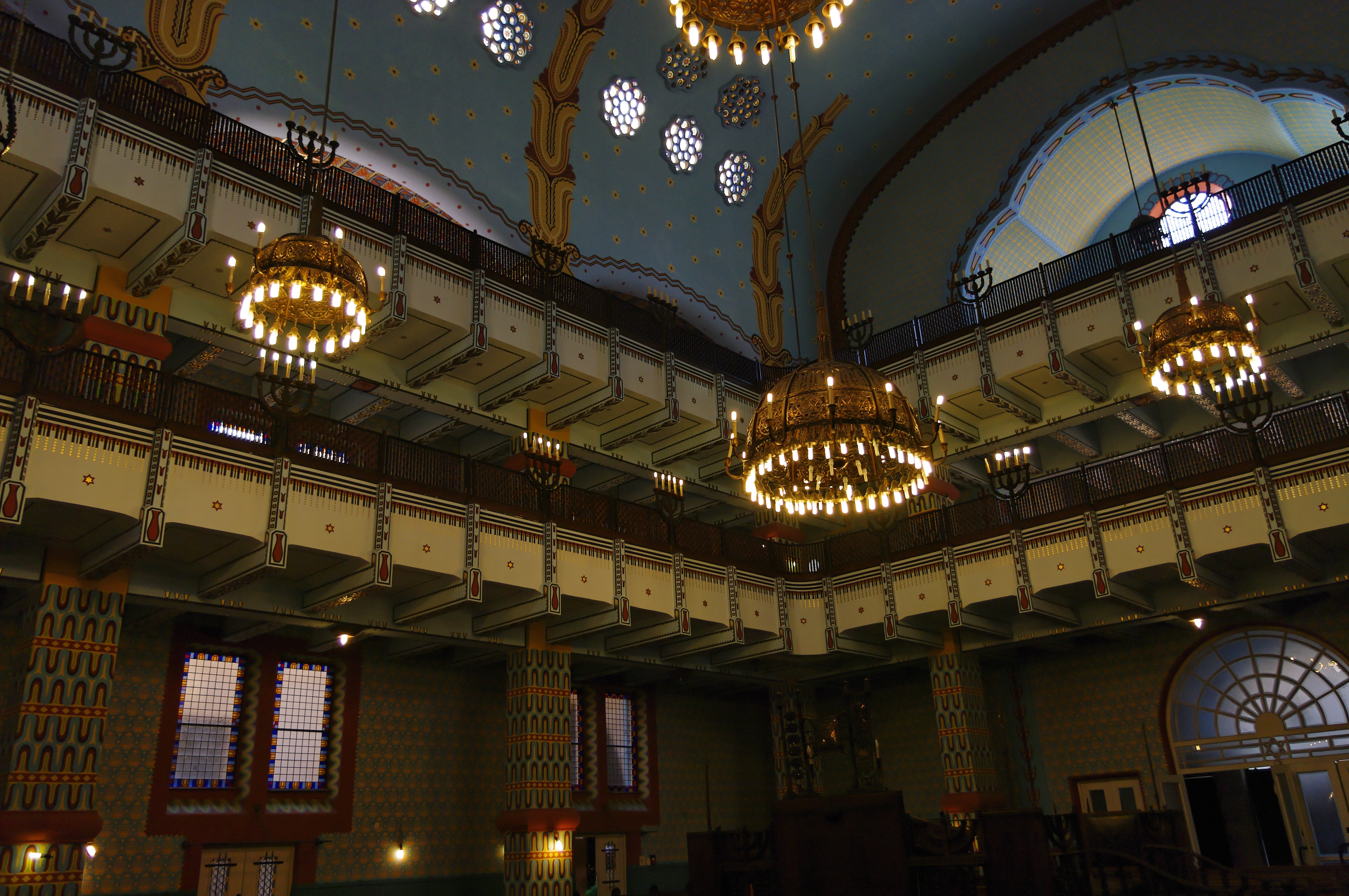
Kazinczy Street Orthodox Synagogue

==== 1910 census ====
According to the 1910 census, the number of Jews was 911,227, or 4.99% of the 18,264,533 people living in Hungary (In addition, there were 21,231 Jews in autonomous Croatia-Slavonia). This was a 28.7% increase in absolute terms since the 1890 census, and a 0.3% increase (from 4.7%) in the overall population of Hungary. At the time, the Jewish natural growth rate was higher than the Christian (although the difference had been narrowing), but so was the emigration rate, mainly to the United States. (The total emigration from Austria-Hungary to the U.S. in 1881–1912 was 3,688,000 people, including 324,000 Jews (8.78%). In the 1880–1913 period, a total of 2,019,000 people emigrated from Hungary to the US. Thus, an estimated 177,000 Jews emigrated from Hungary to the US during this total period.)

The schism in Hungarian Jewry saw the development of three religious denominations. Budapest, the South and West had a Neolog majority (related to modern US Conservative and Reform Judaism – the kipah and organ were both used in religious worship in the synagogues). Traditionalists ("Status quo ante") were the smallest of the three, mainly in the North. The East and North of the country were overwhelmingly Orthodox (more orthodox than "status quo ante"). In broad terms, Jews whose ancestors had come from Moravia in the 18th century tended to become Neolog at the split in 1869; those whose ancestors were from Galicia identified as Orthodox.

The net loss for Judaism due to conversions was relatively low before the end of the Great War: 240 people/year between 1896 and 1900, 404 between 1901 and 1910, and 435 people/year between 1911 and 1917. According to records, 10,530 people left Judaism, and 2,244 converted to Judaism between 1896 and 1917.

The majority (75.7%) of the Jewish population reported Hungarian as their primary language, so they were counted as ethnically Hungarian in the census. The Yiddish speakers were counted as ethnically German. According to this classification, 6.94% of the ethnic Hungarians and 11.63% of the Germans of Hungary were Jewish. In total, Hungarian speakers made up a 54.45% majority in Hungary; German speakers (including those who spoke Yiddish), made up 10.42% of the population.

Population of the capital, Budapest, was 23% Jewish (about the same ratio as in New York City). This community had established numerous religious and educational institutions. Pest was more Jewish than Buda. The prosperity, cultural, and financial prominence of Budapest's large Jewish community attested to its successful integration. Indeed, commentators opined in 1911 that Hungary had "absorbed" their Jews and "it has come to pass that there is no anti-Semitism in Budapest, although the Hebrew element is proportionately much larger (21% as compared to 9%) than it is in Vienna, the Mecca of the Jew-baiter" At that time Karl Lueger, mayor of Vienna referred to the capital as Judapest, alluding to the high proportion of Jews. Budapest had the second largest Jewish population among the world's cities, after New York.

Before the Hungarian Revolution of 1848, Jews in Hungary were prevented from owning land, which resulted in many going into business. In 1910, 60.96% of merchants, 58.11% of the book printers, 41.75% of the innkeepers, 24.42% of the bakers, 24.07% of the butchers, 21.04% of the tailors, and 8.90% of the shoemakers of Hungary were Jewish. 48.5% of the physicians in the country (2701 out of 5565) were Jewish. In the 1893–1913 period, Jews made up roughly 20% of the students of the gimnázium high school (where classical subjects were emphasized) students and 37% of reál high school (where practical subjects were emphasized).

The strong class divisions of Hungary were represented in the Jewish population. About 3.1% of the Jews belonged to the "large employer" and "agricultural landowner of more than 100 hold, i.e. 57 hectares" class, 3.2% to the "small (<100 hold) landholder" class, 34.4% to the "working", i.e. wage-earning employee class, while 59.3% belonged to the self-employed or salary-earning middle class.

Stephen Roth writes, "Hungarian Jews were opposed to Zionism because they hoped that somehow they could achieve equality with other Hungarian citizens, not just in law but in fact, and that they could be integrated into the country as Hungarian Israelites. The word 'Israelite' (Hungarian: Izraelita) denoted only religious affiliation and was free from the ethnic or national connotations usually attached to the term 'Jew'. Hungarian Jews attained remarkable achievements in business, culture and less frequently even in politics. By 1910 about 900,000 religious Jews made up approximately 5% of the population of Hungary and about 23% of Budapest's citizenry. Jews accounted for 54% of commercial business owners, 85% of financial institution directors and owners in banking, and 62% of all employees in commerce, 20% of all general grammar school students, and 37% of all commercial scientific grammar school students, 31.9% of all engineering students, and 34.1% of all students in human faculties of the universities. Religious Jews were accounted for 48.5% of all physicians, and 49.4% of all lawyers/jurists in Hungary. During the cabinet of pm. István Tisza three Jewish men were appointed as ministers. The first was Samu Hazai (Minister of War), János Harkányi (Minister of Trade) and János Teleszky (Minister of Finance). By 1910 22% of the Members of Parliament were Jews (45% in the governing National Party of Work).

While the Jewish population of the lands of the Dual Monarchy was about five percent, Jews made up nearly eighteen percent of the reserve officer corps. Thanks to the modernity of the constitution and to the benevolence of emperor Franz Joseph, the Austrian Jews came to regard the era of Austria-Hungary as a golden era of their history.

In absolute numbers, Budapest had by far the largest number of Jews (203,000), followed by Nagyvárad (Oradea) with 15,000, Újpest and Miskolc with about 10,000 each, Máramarossziget (Sighetu Marmaţiei), Munkács (Mukachevo), Pozsony (Bratislava), Debrecen with 8,000, Kolozsvár (Cluj-Napoca), Szatmárnémeti (Satu Mare), Temesvár (Timișoara), Kassa (Košice) with about 7,000 each.

Patriotism and support for Hungarian nationalism, as well as for Magyarization, was high among the Jews of Hungary. A notable example is Félix Somló, a legal scholar and professor at the Franz Joseph University of Kolozsvár, in Transylvania. After the First World War and the signing of the Treaty of Trianon, which marked the union of Transylvania with Romania, Somló refused the Romanian authorities' invitation to become a professor at the University of Bucharest. Instead, he published his will in Budapest, leaving all of his wealth to the League for Hungary's Territorial Integrity, and then he committed suicide.

== Interwar period (1918–1939) ==
=== Population ===
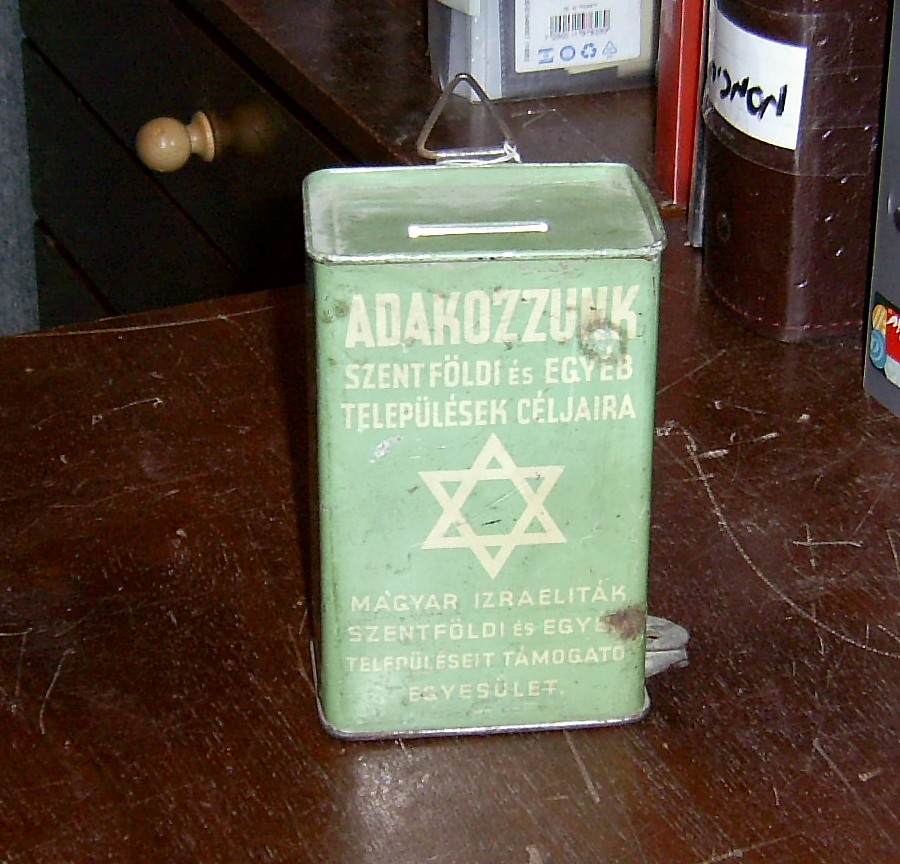
Magyar Jewish tzedaka box, possibly for donations to the Keren Kayemet/JNF.

Using data from the 1910 census, 51.7% of the Hungarian Jews lived in territories that stayed inside the "small" Hungary after 1921, 25.5% (232,000) lived in territories that later became part of Czechoslovakia, 19.5% (178,000) became part of Romania, 2.6% (23,000) became part of Yugoslavia, 0.5% (5,000) became part of Austria and finally 0.2% (2,000) lived in Fiume, which became part of Italy after 1924. According to the censuses of 1930–1931, 238,460/192,833/about 22,000 Jews lived in parts of Czechoslovakia/Romania/Yugoslavia formerly belonging to Hungary, which means that the overall number of people declaring themselves Jewish remained unchanged in the Carpathian basin between 1910 and 1930 [a decrease of 26,000 in the post-WWI Hungary, a 6,000 increase in Czechoslovakia and a 15,000 increase in Romania].

According to the census of December 1920 in the "small" Hungary, the percentage of Jews increased in the preceding decade in Sátoraljaújhely (to 30.4%), Budapest (23.2%), Újpest (20.0%), Nyíregyháza (11.7%), Debrecen (9.9%), Pécs (9.0%), Sopron (7.5%), Makó (6.4%), Rákospalota (6.1%), Kispest (5.6%) and Békéscsaba (to 5.6%), while decreased in the other 27 towns with more than 20 thousand inhabitants. Overall, 31.1% of the Jewish population lived in villages and towns with less than 20 thousand inhabitants.

In 1920, 46.3% of the medical doctors, 41.2% of the veterinarians, 21.4% of the pharmacists of Hungary were Jewish, as well as 34.3% of the journalists, 24.5% of performers of music, 22.7% of the theater actors, 16.8% of the painters and sculptors. Among the owners of land of more than 1000 hold, i.e. 570 hectares, 19.6% were Jewish. Among the 2739 factories in Hungary, 40.5% had a Jewish owner.

The following table shows the number of people who declared to be Israelite (Jewish) at the censuses inside the post-WWI territory of Hungary. Between 1920 and 1945, it was illegal for Hungarians to fail to declare their religion. A person's religion was written on their birth certificate, marriage license (except in 1919, during the short-lived Commune, see Hungarian Soviet Republic), and even on a child's school grade reports.

Census	December 31, 1910 (inside 1937 borders)	December 31, 1920	December 31, 1930	January 31, 1941 (inside 1937 borders)	1949	2001	2011
"izraelita"	471,355	473,310	444,567	400,981	133,861	12,871	10,965
% of total	6.19%	5.93%	5.12%	4.30%	1.45%	0.13%	0.11%

The net loss for Judaism due to official conversions was 26,652 people between 1919 and 1938, while 4,288 people converted into the faith, 30,940 left it. The endpoints of this period, 1919–1920 (white terror) and 1938 (anti-Jewish law) contributed to more than half of this loss; between 1921 and 1930, the net loss rested around pre-war levels (260 people/year).:

	1896–1900 (pre-WWI borders)	1901–1910 (pre-WWI borders)	1911–1917 (pre-WWI borders)	1919–1920	1921–1930	1931–1937	1938 alone
Total years	5	10	7	2	10	7	1
Converted from Judaism	1,681	5,033	3,816	9,103	5,315	7,936	8,586
Converted to Judaism	481	994	769	316	2,718	1,156	98

Population of Budapest	1851	1869	1880	1890	1900	1910	1920	1930	1941	1949	2001 (Greater)	2011 (Greater)
Total	178,062	270,476	355,682	486,671	703,448	880,371	928,996	1,006,184	1,164,963	1,057,912	1,777,921	1,729,040
Jewish	26,887 (15.1%)	44,890 (16.6%)	70,227 (19.7%)	102,377 (21.0%)	166,198 (23.6%)o	203,687 (23.1%)	215,512 (23.2%)	204,371 (20.3%)	184,453 (15.8%)	96,537 (9.1%)	9,468 (0.5%)	7,925 (0.5%)

In 1926, the districts I, II, III of Buda were Jewish 8%,11%,10% respectively. The 19,000 Jews of Buda constituted about 9.3% of both the total population of Buda and the entire Jewish population of Budapest. On the left (Pest) side of the Danube, downtown Pest (Belváros, district IV then) was 18% Jewish. Districts V (31%), VI (28%), VII (36%), VIII (22%), IX (13%) had large Jewish populations, while district X had 6%. The four Neolog communities of Budapest (I-II, III, IV-IX, X) had a total of 66,300 members paying their dues, while the Orthodox community had about 7,000 members paying religious taxes.

In the countryside of the post-WWI Hungary, the Orthodox had a slight edge (about 49%) over the Neolog (46%). Budapest and countryside combined, 65.72% of the 444,567 Jews belonged to Neolog communities, 5.03% to status quo ante, while 29.25% were Orthodox in 1930. The Jewish communities suffered a 5.6% decline in the 1910–1930 period, on the territory of the "small" Hungary, due to emigration and conversion.

The Jews of Hungary were fairly well integrated into Hungarian society by the time of the First World War. Class distinction was very significant in Hungary in general, and among the Jewish population in particular. Rich bankers, factory owners, lower middle class artisans and poor factory workers did not mingle easily. In 1926, there were 50,761 Jewish families living in Budapest. Of that number, 65% lived in apartments that contained one or two rooms, 30% had three or four rooms, while 5% lived in apartments with more than 4 rooms.

# of households	max 1 room	2 rooms	3 rooms	4 rooms	5 rooms	min 6 rooms
Jewish= 50,761	25.4%	39.6%	21.2%	9.2%	3.1%	1.5%
Christian = 159,113	63.3%	22.1%	8.4%	3.8%	1.4%	1.0%

Education. The following chart illustrates the effect of the 1920 "numerus clausus" Law on the percentage of Jewish university students at two Budapest Universities.

Jewish students	1913	1925 Spring
Budapest University of Sciences	34.1%	7.7%
Budapest University of Technology and Economics	31.9%	8.8%

Those who could afford went to study to other European countries like Austria, Germany, Italy and Czechoslovakia. In 1930, of all males aged six and older,

Schooling	>= 8 years	>= 12 years	university degree
General population	10.8%	5.8%	2.1%
Jews in the countryside	36.6%	17.0%	5.0%
Jews in Budapest	56.5%	31.7%	8.1%

Seven of the thirteen Nobel prize winners born in Hungary are Jewish. In sports, 55.6% of the individual gold medal winners of Hungary at the Summer Olympic Games between 1896 and 1912 were Jewish. This number dropped to 17.6% in the interwar period of 1924–1936.

Period	1896–1912	1924–1936	1948–1956	1960–1972	1976–1992 (1984 excluded)	1996–2008
# of Olympics	5	4	3	4	4	4
Total Golds	442	482	440	684	903	1172
Hungarian Golds	11	22	35	32	33	26
Hungarian/total World	2.49%	4.56%	7.95%	4.68%	3.65%	2.22%
Hungarian Individual Gold	9	17	26	22	27	16
Hungarian Jewish Individual	5	3	6	4	0	0
Jewish/total individual Hungarian	55.56%	17.65%	23.08%	18.18%	0%	0%
Jews in Gold Teams	57.14% = 8/14	28.21%= 11/39				
Jews in population	4.99% (1910)	5.12% (1930)	1.45% (1949)			0.13% (2001)

== Revolution ==
More than 10,000 Jews died and thousands were wounded and disabled fighting for Hungary in World War I. But these sacrifices by patriotic Hungarian Jews may have been outweighed by the chaotic events following the war's end.

With the defeat and dissolution of the Austro-Hungarian Empire, Hungary would be forced by the Allies to adhere to the Treaty of Trianon, which ceded to neighboring nations fully two-thirds of Hungary's imperial territory and two-thirds of its population, including a third of its ethnically Magyar citizens and many Jews. These losses provoked deep anger and hostility in the remaining Hungarian population.

The first post-war government was led by Mihály Károlyi, and was the first modern effort at liberal democratic government in Hungary. But it was cut short in a spasm of communist revolution, which would have serious implications for the manner in which Hungarian Jews were viewed by their fellow-countrymen.

In March 1919, Communist and Social Democrat members of a coalition government ousted Karolyi; soon after (March 21), the Communists were to take power as their Social Democrat colleagues were willing neither to accept nor to refuse the Vix Note to cede a significant part of the Great Plains to Romania and the communists took control of Hungary's governing institutions. While popular at first among Budapest's progressive elite and proletariat, the so-called Hungarian Soviet Republic fared poorly in almost all of its aims, particularly its efforts to regain territories occupied by Slovakia (although achieving some transitional success here) and Romania. All the less palatable excesses of Communist uprisings were in evidence during these months, particularly the formation of squads of brutal young men practicing what they called "revolutionary terror" to intimidate and suppress dissident views. All but the one Sándor Garbai, the revolution's leaders, including Béla Kun, Tibor Szamuely, and Jenő Landler – were of Jewish ancestry. As in other countries where Communism was viewed as an immediate threat, the presence of ethnic Jews in positions of revolutionary leadership helped foster the notion of a Jewish-Bolshevik conspiracy.

Kun's regime was crushed after four and a half months when the Romanian army entered Budapest; it was quickly followed by the reactionary forces under the command of the former Austro-Hungarian admiral, Miklós Horthy. The sufferings endured during the brief revolution, and their exploitation by ultra-nationalist movements, helped generate stronger suspicions among non-Jewish Hungarians, and undergirded pre-existing antisemitic views.

Beginning in July 1919, officers of Horthy's National Army engaged in a brutal string of counter-reprisals against Hungarian communists and their allies, real or imagined. This series of pogroms directed at Jews, progressives, peasants and others is known as the White Terror. Horthy's personal role in these reprisals is still subject of debate (in his memoirs he refused to disavow the violence, saying that "only an iron broom" could have swept the country clean). Tallying the numbers of victims of the different terror campaigns in this period is still a matter of some political dispute but the White Terror is generally considered to have claimed more lives than the repressions of the Kun regime by an order of magnitude, thousands vs hundreds.

== Interwar years ==
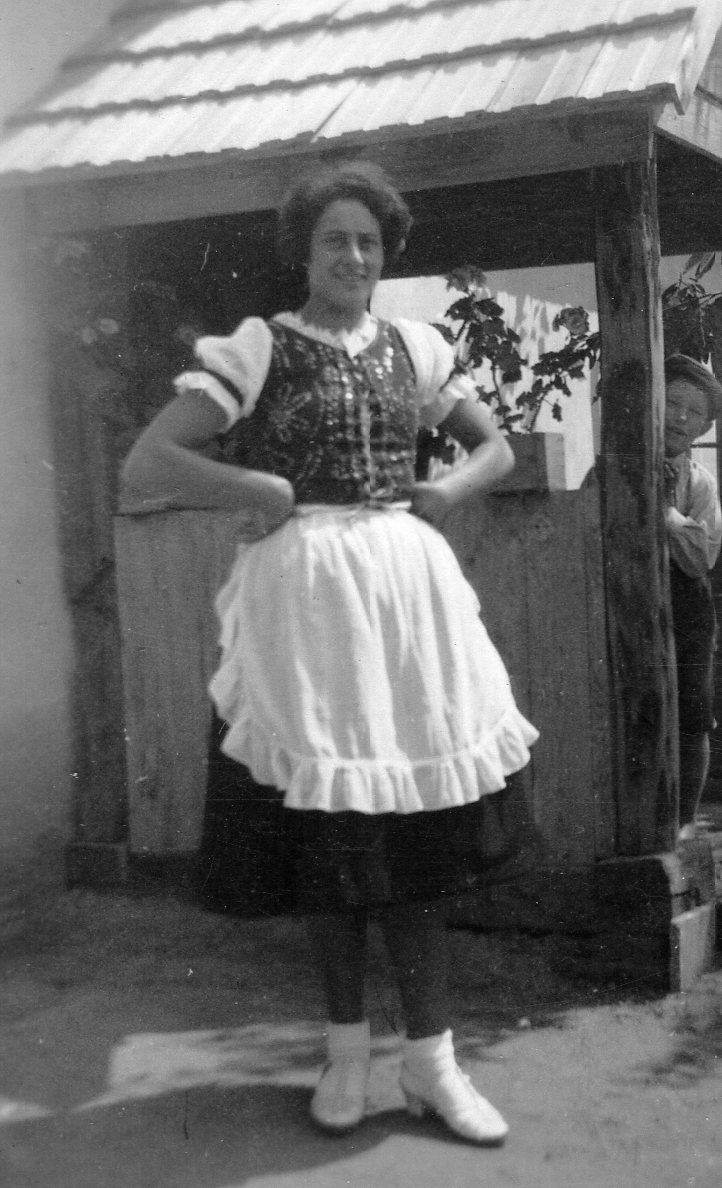
A Jewish Hungarian country girl around 1930.

Jews represented one-fourth of all university students and 43% percent at Budapest Technological University. In 1920, 60 percent of Hungarian doctors, 51 percent of lawyers, 39 percent of all privately employed engineers and chemists, 34 percent of editors and journalists, and 29 percent of musicians identified themselves as Jews by religion.

Resentment of this Jewish trend of success was widespread: Admiral Horthy himself declared that he was "an anti-Semite", and remarked in a letter to one of his prime ministers, "I have considered it intolerable that here in Hungary everything, every factory, bank, large fortune, business, theater, press, commerce, etc. should be in Jewish hands, and that the Jew should be the image reflected of Hungary, especially abroad."

Unfortunately for Jews they had also become, by a quirk of history, the most visible minority remaining in Hungary (besides ethnic Germans and Gypsies); the other large "non-Hungarian" populations (including Slovaks, Slovenes, Croats, and Romanians, among others) had been abruptly excised from the Hungarian population by the territorial losses at Trianon. That and the highly visible role of Jews in the economy, the media and the professions, as well as in the leadership of the 1919 Communist dictatorship left Hungary's Jews as an ethnically separate group which could serve as a scapegoat for the nation's ills.

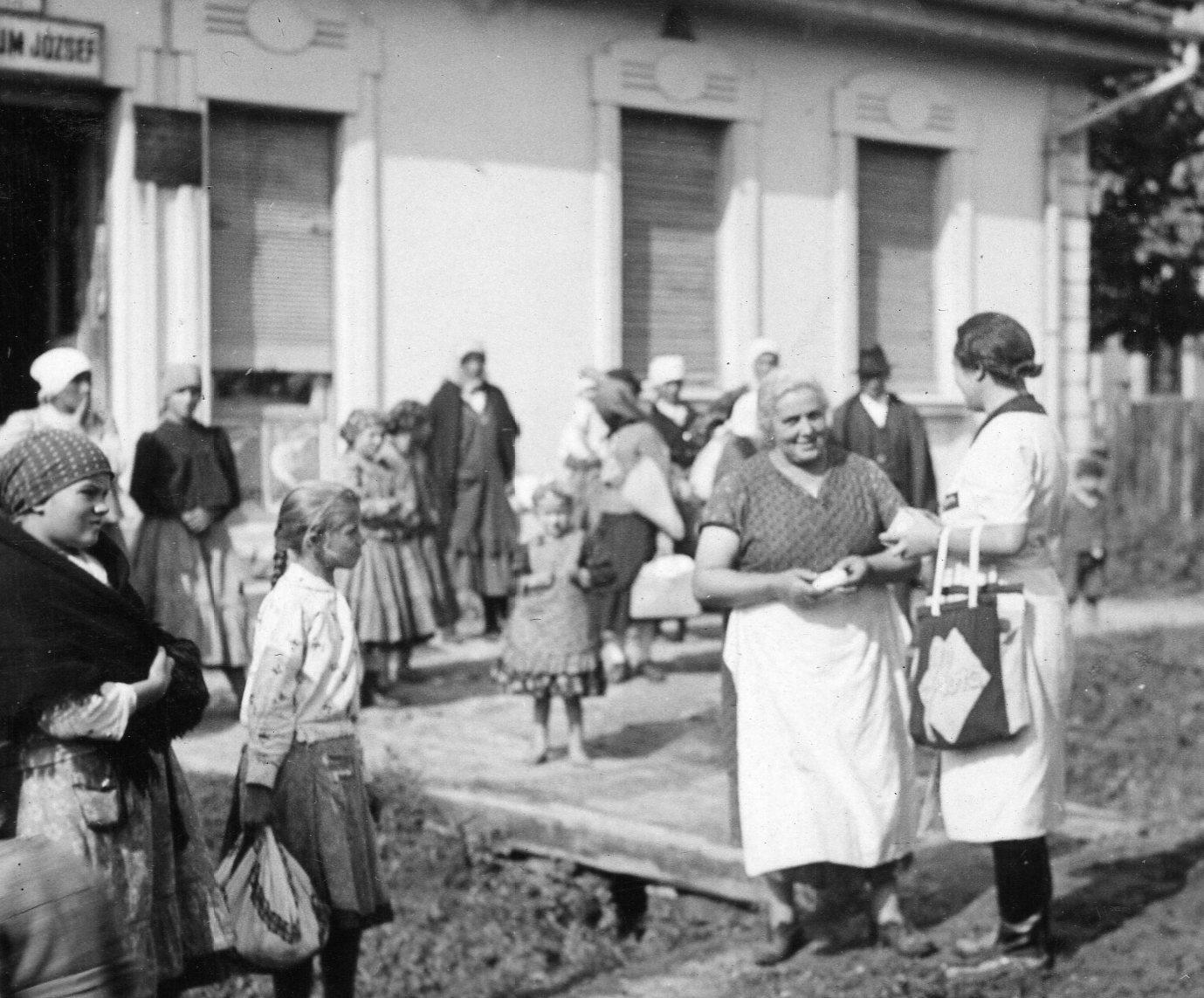
Local customers in front of a Jewish grocery in Berzence, around 1930.

The scapegoating began quickly. In 1920, Horthy's government passed a "numerus clausus" law that placed limits on the number of minority students in proportion of their size of the population, thus restricting the Jewish enrollment at universities to five percent or less.

Anti-Jewish policies grew more repressive in the interwar period as Hungary's leaders, who remained committed to regaining territories lost in WWI, chose to align themselves (albeit warily) with the fascist governments of Germany and Italy – the international actors most likely to stand behind Hungary's claims. The inter-war years also saw the emergence of flourishing fascist groups, such as the Hungarian National Socialist Party and the Arrow Cross Party.

== Jewish Conversions to Christianity in Hungary ==
About 20,000 conversions took place in Hungary between 1867 and 1918.

== Anti-Jewish measures ==
=== Anti-Jewish Laws (1938–1942) ===
Starting in 1938, Hungary under Miklós Horthy passed a series of anti-Jewish measures in emulation of Germany's Nuremberg Laws.

1. The "First Jewish Law" (May 29, 1938) restricted the number of Jews in each commercial enterprise, in the press, among physicians, engineers and lawyers to twenty percent.
2. The "Second Jewish Law" (May 5, 1939), for the first time, defined Jews racially: individuals with two, three or four Jewish-born grandparents were declared Jewish.
3. The "Third Jewish Law" (August 8, 1941) prohibited intermarriage and penalized sexual intercourse between Jews and non-Jews.
4. The "Fourth Jewish Law" (September 6, 1942) banned Jews from owning or purchasing land.

Their employment in government at any level was forbidden, they could not be editors at newspapers, their numbers were restricted to six per cent among theater and movie actors, physicians, lawyers and engineers. Private companies were forbidden to employ more than 12% Jews. 250,000 Hungarian Jews lost their income. Most of them lost their right to vote as well: before the second Jewish law, about 31% of the Jewish population of Borsod county (Miskolc excluded), 2496 people had this right. At the next elections, less than a month after this new anti-Jewish legislation, only 38 privileged Jews could vote.

In the elections of May 28–29, Nazi and Arrow Cross (Nyilas) parties received one quarter of the votes and 52 out of 262 seats. Their support was even larger, usually between 1/3 and 1/2 of the votes, where they were on the ballot at all, since they were not listed in large parts of the country For instance, the support for Nazi parties was above 43% in the election districts of Zala, Győr-Moson, Budapest surroundings, Central and Northern Pest-Pilis, and above 36% in Veszprém, Vas, Szabolcs-Ung, Sopron, Nógrád-Hont, Jász-Nagykun, Southern Pest town and Buda town. The Nazi parties were not on the ballot mainly in the Eastern third of the country and in Somogy, Baranya, Tolna, Fejér. Their smallest support was in Békés county (15%), Pécs town (19%), Szeged town (22%) and in Northern Pest town (27%)

=== January 1941 census ===
According to Magyarország történelmi kronológiája, the census of January 31, 1941, found that 6.2% of the population of 13,643,621, i.e. 846,000 people, were considered Jewish according to the racial laws of that time. In addition, in April 1941, Hungary annexed the Bácska (Bačka), the Muraköz (Međimurje County) and Muravidék (Prekmurje) regions from the occupied Yugoslavia, with 1,025,508 people including 15,000 Jews (data are from October 1941). This means that inside the May 1941 borders of Hungary, there were 861,000 people (or 5.87%) who were at least half Jewish, and therefore were considered Jewish. From this number, 725,000 (or 4.94%) were Jewish in accordance with Jewish religious law (4.30% in pre-1938 Hungary, 7.15% in the territories annexed from Czechoslovakia and Romania in 1938–1940 and 1.38% in the territories annexed from Yugoslavia in 1941).

year of annexation; from which country	Region	Jewish by religion in 1941	Jewish by law but not by confessed religion	Jewish
pre-1938; Hungary	Budapest	185,000	36,000–72,000	221,000–257,000
pre-1938; Hungary	countryside	216,000	16,000–38,000	232,000–254,000
1938; Czechoslovakia	southern Slovakia	39,000	1,000–10,000	40,000–49,000
1938; Czechoslovakia	lower Carpatho-Ruthenia (lower Ung and Bereg counties)	39,000	–	39,000
1939; Czechoslovakia	upper Carpatho-Ruthenia (ex-Czech part only)	81,000	–	81,000
1940; Romania	Northern Transylvania	151,000	3,000–15,000	154,000–166,000
1941; Yugoslavia	Bácska and other territories	14,000	1,000	15,000
Total		725,000	57,000–136,000	782,000–861,000

The following is from another source, a statistical summary written in the beginning of 1944 and referring to the 1941 census data:

Region by year of annexation	Yiddish+Hebrew by mother tongue in 1941	Jewish by ethnicity in 1941	Jewish by religion in 1941	Jewish by religion in 1930	Jewish by religion in 1910
pre-1938	1,357+222	9,764 (0.10%)	400,980 (4.30%)	444,567 (5.12%)	471,378 (6.19%)
1938	10,735+544	14,286 (1.35%)	77,700 (7.32%)	78,190 (7.56%)	66,845 (7.69%)
1939	68,643+1,987	64,191 (9.25%)	80,960 (11.67%)	71,782 (12.11%)	63,324 (12.75%)
1940	45,492+2,960	47,357 (1.84%)	151,125 (5.86%)	148,288 (6.20%)	134,225 (6.14%)
1941	338+47	3,857 (0.37%)	14,242 (1.38%)	?	17,642 (1.87%)
Total	126,565+5,760	139,455 (0.95%)	725,007 (4.94%)		753,415 (6.22%)

The question about Jewish grandparents was added late to the questionnaires at the census of 1941, when some of the sheets had already been printed. In addition, a lot of Christians of Jewish ancestry did not answer this question truthfully. So while about 62,000 Christians admitted some Jewish ancestry (including 38,000 in Budapest), their actual number was estimated at least 100,000:

Religion	4 Jewish grandparents	3	2	1
Jewish in Budapest	175,651	448	7,655	699
Christian in Budapest	26,120	616	9,238	1,957
Jewish in the entire country	708,419	1,639	15,011	1,938
Christian in the entire country	38,574	888	18,015	4,071

=== First massacres ===
It is not clear whether the 10,000–20,000 Jewish refugees (from Poland and elsewhere) were counted in the January 1941 census. They and anyone who could not prove legal residency since 1850, about 20,000 people, were deported to southern Poland and either abandoned there or were handed over to the Germans between July 15 and August 12, 1941. In practice, the Hungarians deported many people whose families had lived in the area for generations. In some cases, applications for residency permits were allowed to pile up without action by Hungarian officials until after the deportations had been carried out. The vast majority of those deported were massacred in Kameniec-Podolsk (Kamianets-Podilskyi massacre) at the end of August. (Note: "A few thousand of the deportees were simply abandoned by their captors in the areas surrounding Kaminets-Podolsk. Most subsequently perished with other Jewish residents of the area as a result of transports or aktions in the many ghettos that were established but a handful survived, either by returning to the area of their homes, or otherwise. The number of people deported over the Carpathians was 19,426 according to a document found in 2012 .")

In the massacres of Újvidék (Novi Sad) and villages nearby, 2,550–2,850 Serbs, 700–1,250 Jews and 60–130 others were murdered by the Hungarian Army and "Csendőrség" (Gendarmerie) in January 1942. Those responsible, Ferenc Feketehalmy-Czeydner, Márton Zöldy, József Grassy, László Deák and others were later tried in Budapest during December 1943 and were sentenced, but some of them escaped to Germany.

During the war, Jews were called up to serve in unarmed "labour service" (munkaszolgálat) units which were used to repair bombed railroads, build airports or to clean up minefields at the front barehanded. Approximately 42,000 Jewish labour service troops were killed at the Soviet front in 1942–43, of which about 40% perished in Soviet POW camps. Many died as a result of harsh conditions on the Eastern Front and cruel treatment by their Hungarian sergeants and officers. Another 4,000 forced laborers died in the copper mine of Bor, Serbia. Nevertheless, Miklós Kállay, Prime Minister from March 9, 1942, and Regent Horthy resisted German pressure and refused to allow the deportation of Hungarian Jews to the German extermination camps in occupied Poland. This "anomalous" situation lasted until March 19, 1944, when German troops occupied Hungary and forced Horthy to oust Kállay.

== The Holocaust ==
=== Germany invades Hungary ===
Adolf Eichmann in 1942

On March 18, 1944, Adolf Hitler summoned Hungarian regent Miklós Horthy to a conference in Austria, where he demanded greater acquiescence from the Hungarian state. Horthy resisted, but his efforts were fruitless: German tanks rolled into Budapest while he attended the conference. On March 23, the government of Döme Sztójay was installed. Among his other first moves, Sztójay legalised the Arrow Cross Party, which quickly began organising. During the four days interregnum following the German occupation, the Ministry of the Interior was put in the hands of László Endre and László Baky, right-wing politicians well known for their hostility to Jews. Their boss, Andor Jaross, was another committed antisemite. Immediately after the occupation, the German and Hungarian authorities established Judenräte throughout Hungary.

A few days later, Ruthenia, Northern Transylvania, and the border region with Croatia and Serbia were placed under military command. On April 9, Prime Minister Sztójay and the Germans obliged Hungary to place at the disposal of the Reich 300,000 Jewish laborers. Five days later, on April 14, Endre, Baky, and Adolf Eichmann, the SS officer in charge of organising the deportation of Hungarian Jews to the German Reich, decided to deport all the Jews of Hungary.

Although in 1943, the BBC Polish Service broadcast about the exterminations, the BBC Hungarian Service did not discuss the Jews. A 1942 memo for the BBC Hungarian Service, written by Carlile Macartney, a British Foreign Office adviser on Hungary, said: "We shouldn't mention the Jews at all." Macartney believed that most Hungarians were antisemitic and that mentioning the Jews would alienate much of the population. (Note: "[T]he BBC broadcast every day, giving updates on the war, general news, and opinion pieces on Hungarian politics. But among all these broadcasts, there were crucial things that were not being said, things that might have warned thousands of Hungarian Jews of the horrors to come in the event of German occupation. A memo setting out policy for the BBC Hungarian Service in 1942 states: 'We shouldn't mention the Jews at all.'") Most of the Jews did not believe that the Holocaust might happen in Hungary: "This might be happening in Galicia to Polish Jews, but this can't happen in our very cultivated Hungarian state." (Note: "The Hungarian Jews in 1944 knew all about it. They had a lot of information because Jewish refugees were coming to Hungary, in 1942 and 1943, giving reports about what was happening in Poland, and what was the reaction from the Jews. This is Hungary. This might be happening in Galicia to Polish Jews, but this can't happen in our very cultivated Hungarian state. It is impossible that even early in 1944, the Jewish leadership there didn't have some information about what was happening. People were escaping from the extermination camps just 80 km from the Hungarian border and there were letters and reports and of course the BBC. I think part of the problem of the Holocaust was that potential victims couldn't believe the information. The idea that something so atrocious would come from Germany and the European civilized environment was so unimaginable that they didn't take it for real, even when they received overwhelming reports from the death camps.") According to Yehuda Bauer, when the deportations to Auschwitz began in May 1944, the Zionist youth movements organized smuggling of Hungarian Jews into Romania. Around 4,000 Hungarian Jews were smuggled into Romania, including the smugglers and those who paid them on the border. The Romanians agreed to let those Jews in, despite heavy German pressure. (Note: "Another major activity, which was financed chiefly by Palestinian funds but which also received some support from JDC, was the smuggling into Romania of Hungarian Jews when the deportations to Auschwitz began in that country in May 1944. It is not quite clear just how many Hungarian Jews managed to get across, but the number was in the neighborhood of 4,0(X). Most of them came by a route organized by the youth movements, though some paid individual smugglers on the border. In Istanbul, Alexander Cretianu, the Rumanian minister, agreed that these Jews should be let into his country. Filderman and Zissu obtained similar assurances in Bucharest, despite heavy German pressure.") However, Romania allied itself with Nazi Germany from 1940 to 1944. Despite Romania not being under German occupation, during the dictatorship of Ion Antonescu, 380,000–400,000 Jews were murdered in the Holocaust in Romanian-controlled areas such as Bessarabia, Bukovina, and Transnistria.

=== Deportation to Auschwitz ===
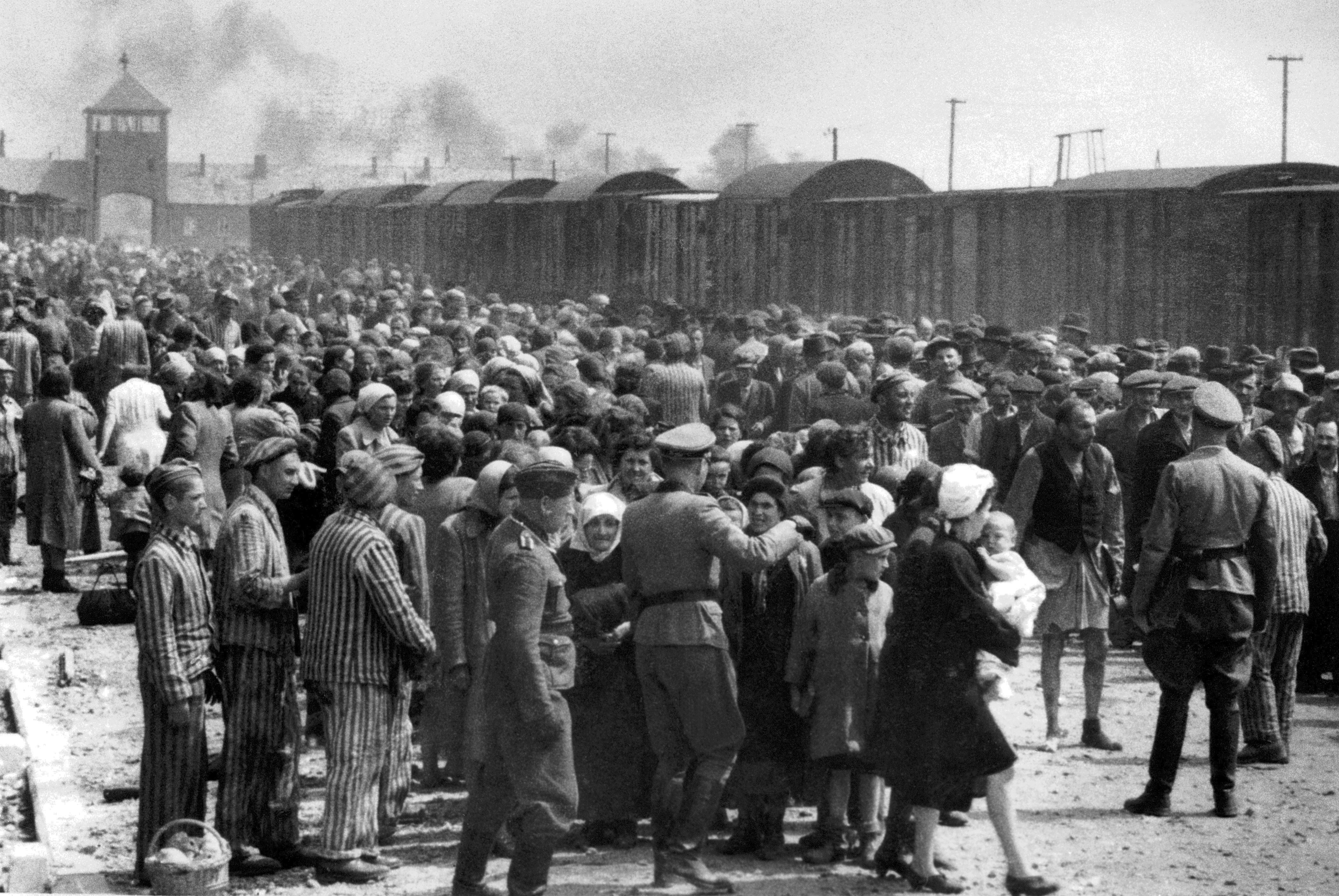
Hungarian Jews on the Judenrampe (Jewish ramp) at Auschwitz II-Birkenau after disembarking from the transport trains. To be sent to the right meant labor; to the left the gas chambers. Photo from the Auschwitz Album (May/June 1944)

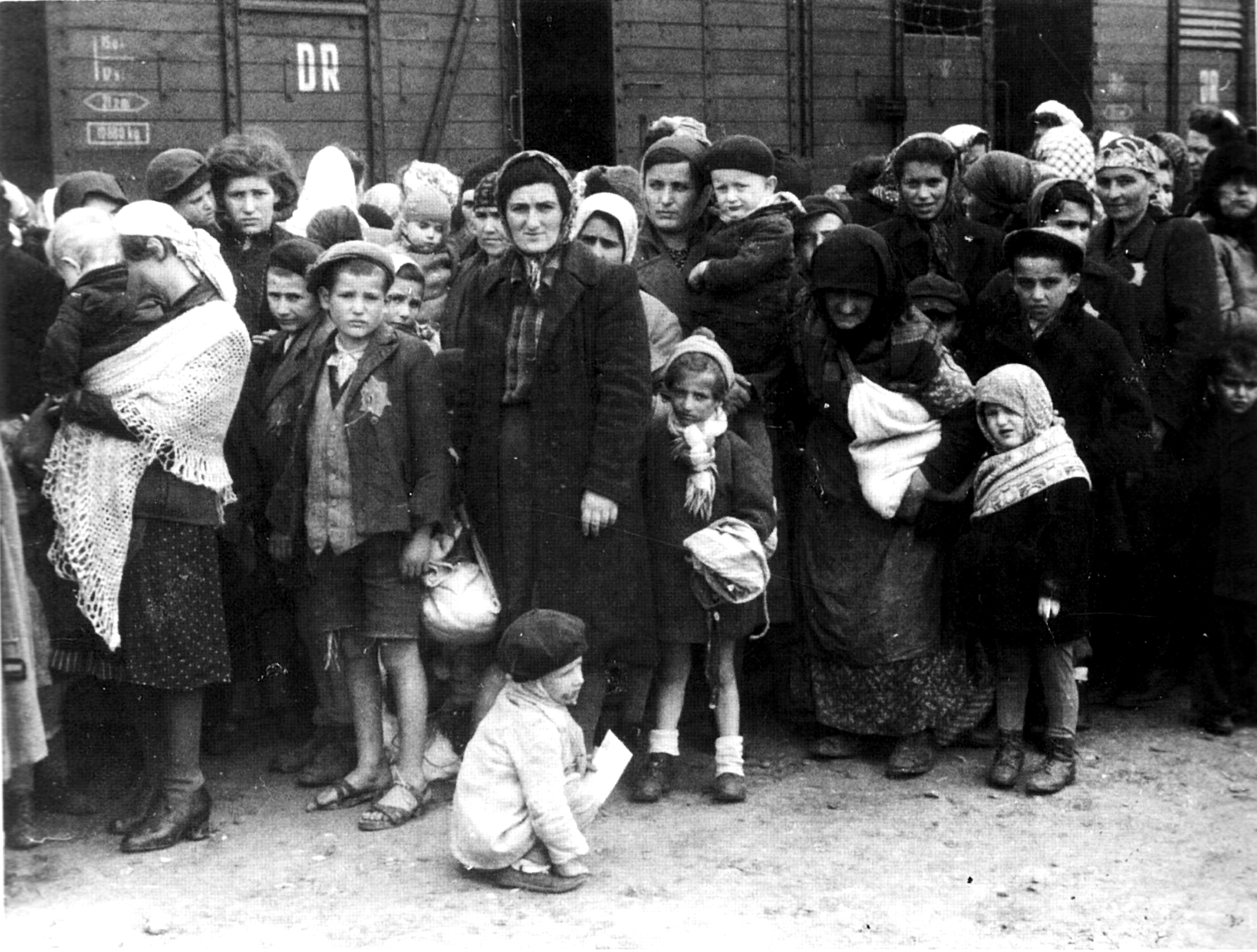
Hungarian Jews from Carpatho-Ruthenia arriving at Auschwitz

SS-Obersturmbannführer Adolf Eichmann, whose duties included supervising the extermination of Jews, set up his staff in the Majestic Hotel and proceeded rapidly in rounding up Jews from the Hungarian provinces outside Budapest and its suburbs. The Yellow Star and Ghettoization laws, and deportation, were accomplished in less than 8 weeks, with the enthusiastic help of the Hungarian authorities, particularly the gendarmerie (csendőrség). The plan was to use 45 cattle cars per train, 4 trains a day, to deport 12,000 Jews to Auschwitz every day from the countryside, starting in mid-May; this was to be followed by the deportation of Jews of Budapest from about July 15.

Just before the deportations began, the Vrba-Wetzler Report reached the Allied officials. Details from the report were broadcast by the BBC on June 15, and printed in The New York Times on June 20. World leaders, including Pope Pius XII (June 25), President Franklin D. Roosevelt on June 26, and King Gustaf V of Sweden on June 30, subsequently pleaded with Horthy to use his influence to stop the deportations. Roosevelt specifically threatened military retaliation if the transports were not ceased. On July 7, Horthy, at last, ordered the transports halted. According to historian Péter Sipos, the Hungarian government had already known about the Jewish genocide since 1943. Horthy's son and daughter-in-law both received copies of the Vrba-Wetzler report in early May before mass deportations began. (Note: After the war, Horthy claimed that he did not know about the Final Solution until August and that he thought the Jews were being sent to concentration camps for labor. Some historians accept this claim.) The Vrba-Wetzler Report is believed to have been passed to Hungarian Zionist leader Rudolf Kastner no later than April 28, 1944; however, Kastner did not make it public.

The first transports to Auschwitz began in early May 1944, and continued, even as Soviet troops approached. The Hungarian government was solely in charge of the Jews' transportation up to the northern border. The Hungarian commander of the Kassa (Košice) railroad station meticulously recorded the trains heading to Auschwitz with their place of departure and the number of people inside them. The first train went through Kassa on May 14. On a typical day, there were three or four trains, with between 3,000 and 4,000 people on each train, for a total of approximately 12,000 Jews delivered to the extermination facilities each day. There were 109 trains during these 33 days through June 16. (There were days when there were as many as six trains.) Between June 25 and 29, there were 10 trains, then an additional 18 trains on July 5–9. The 138th recorded train (with the 400,426th victim) heading to Auschwitz via Kassa was on July 20. Another 10 trains were sent to Auschwitz via other routes (24,000+ people) (the first two left Budapest and Topolya on April 29, and arrived at Auschwitz on May 2), while 7 trains with 20,787 people went to Strasshof between June 25 and 28 (2 each from Debrecen, Szeged, and Baja; 1 from Szolnok). The unique Kastner train left for Bergen-Belsen with 1,685 people on June 30.

"There is no doubt that this is probably the greatest and most horrible crime ever committed in the whole history of the world ..."

— Winston Churchill, 11 July 1944

By July 9, 1944, 437,402 Jews had been deported, according to Reich plenipotentiary in Hungary Edmund Veesenmayer's official German reports. (Note: Veesenmayer's telegram to Wilhelmstrasse (German Foreign Ministry) on July 11: "The concentration and transportation of the Jews from Zone V and the Budapest suburbs were concluded with 55,741 Jews on July 9, as planned. The total result from Zones I-V and the Budapest suburbs has been 437,402." p. 881, document No. 697 in "Wilhelmstrasse és Magyarország", Budapest, Kossuth, 1968.) One hundred and forty-seven trains were sent to Auschwitz, where most of the deportees were murdered on arrival. Because the crematoria could not cope with the corpses, special pits were dug near them, where bodies were burned. It has been estimated that one-third of the murdered victims at Auschwitz were Hungarian. For most of this period, 12,000 Jews were delivered to Auschwitz in a typical day, among them the future writer and Nobel Prize-winner Elie Wiesel, at age 15. Photographs taken at Auschwitz were found after the war showing the arrival of Jews from Hungary at the camp.

The devotion to the cause of the "final solution" of the Hungarian gendarmes surprised even Eichmann himself, who supervised the operation with only twenty officers and a staff of 100, which included drivers, cooks, etc.

=== Efforts to rescue Jews ===
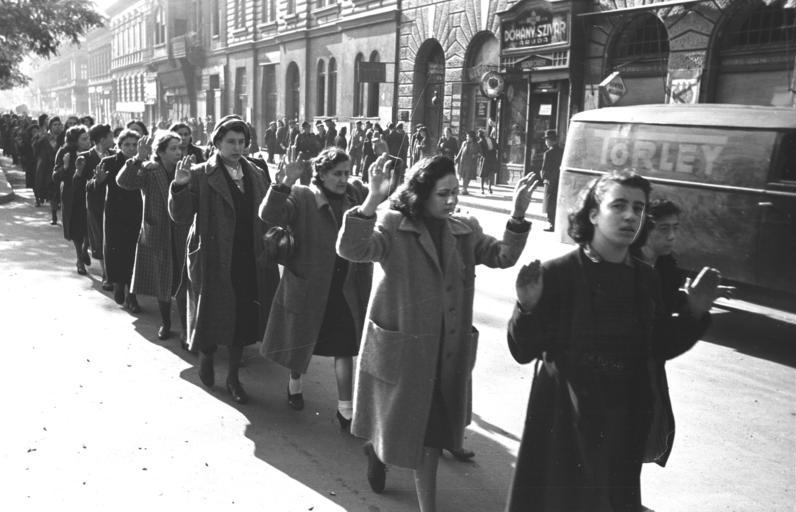
Captured Jewish women in Wesselényi Street, Budapest, October 20–22, 1944

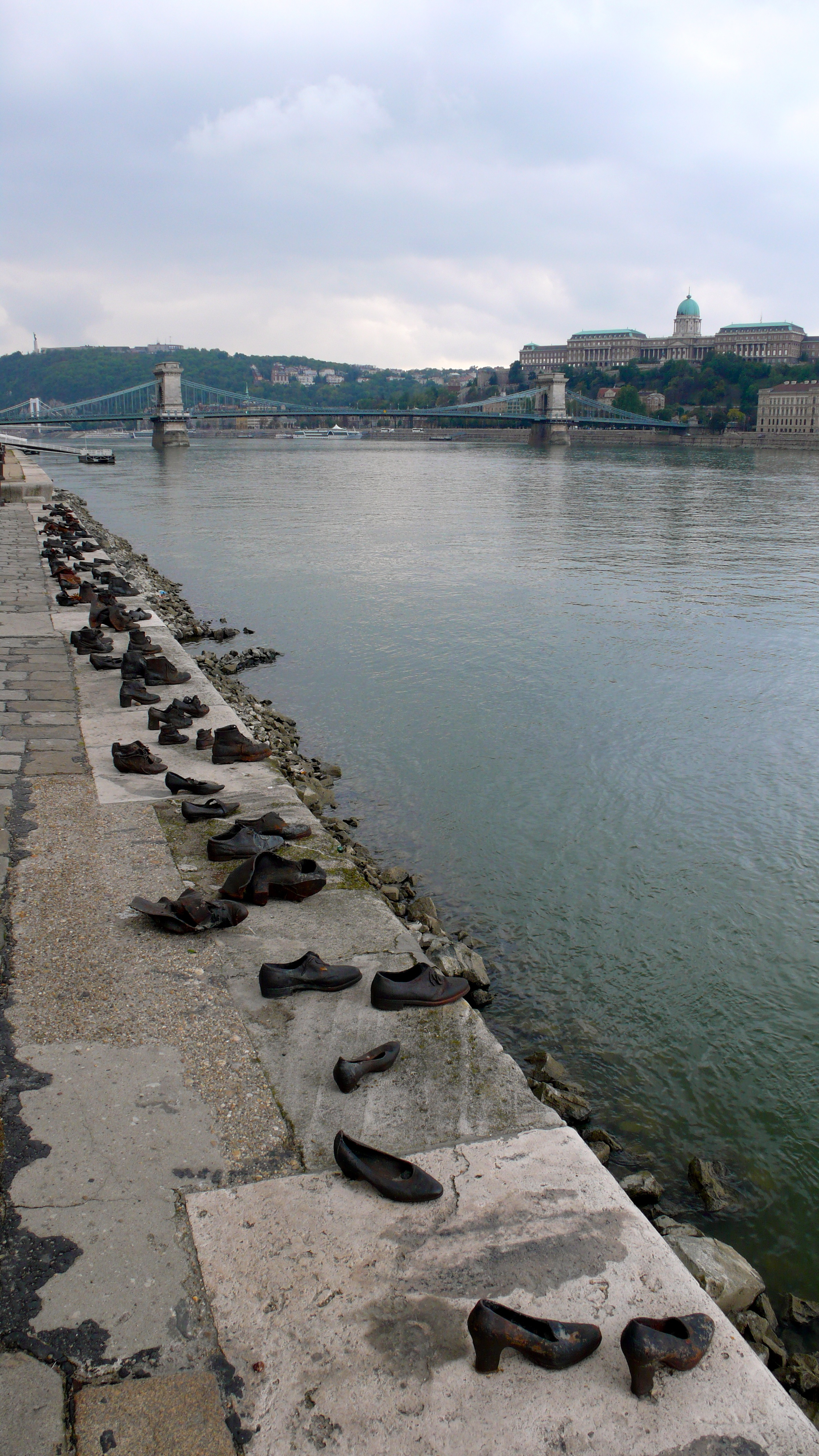
Holocaust Shoe Memorial beside the Danube River in Budapest. The shoes represent Hungarian Jews who lost their lives in January 1945.

Very few Catholic or Protestant clergy members raised their voices against sending the Jews to their death. (Notable was Bishop Áron Márton's sermon in Kolozsvár on May 18). The Catholic Primate of Hungary, Serédi decided not to issue a pastoral letter condemning the deportation of the Jews.

On June 14, the Mayor of Budapest, Ákos Farkas, designated about 1,950 (5%) yellow-star houses where every Jew (20%+) had to move together. The authorities thought that the Allies would not bomb Budapest because the "starred" houses were scattered around the town. On June 15, American bombers dropped leaflets over Budapest threatening punishment for those involved in the deportation of Hungarian Jews. At the end of June, Pope Pius XII, Swedish King Gustav VI, and, in strong terms, U.S. President Franklin D. Roosevelt urged for an immediate halt to the deportations. Horthy ordered the suspension of all deportations on July 6. Nonetheless, another 45,000 Jews were deported from the Trans-Danubian region and the outskirts of Budapest to Auschwitz after this day. "After the failed attempt on Hitler's life, the Germans backed off from pressing Horthy's regime to continue further, large-scale deportations, although some smaller groups continued to be deported by train. In late August, Horthy refused Eichmann's request to restart the deportations. Himmler ordered Eichmann to leave Budapest." (Note: "In late July there was a lull in the deportations. After the failed attempt on Hitler's life, the Germans backed off from pressing Horthy's regime to continue further, large-scale deportations. Smaller groups continued to be deported by train. At least one German police message decoded by GC&CS revealed that one trainload of 1,296 Jews from the town of Sarvar in western Hungary Hungarian Jews being rounded up in Budapest (Courtesy: USHMM) had departed for Auschwitz on August 4.112 In late August, Horthy refused Eichmann's request to re-start the deportations. Himmler ordered Eichmann to leave Budapest.")

The Sztójay government rescheduled the date of deportation of the Jews of Budapest to Auschwitz to August 27. But the Romanians switched sides on August 23, 1944, causing huge problems for the German military. Himmler ordered the cancellation of further deportations from Hungary on August 25, in return for nothing more than Saly Mayer’s promise to see whether the Germans' demands would be met. (Note: "Himmler did issue a definite order against it which reached Budapest on the night between August 24 and August 25, as Veesenmayer reported to Ribbentrop on the latter day. This order stood after Himmler received Becher's cable. It seems, therefore, that in return for nothing more than Mayer's promise to see whether the Germans’ demands would be met, Himmler was ready to desist from the deportation of Budapest Jewry.") Horthy finally dismissed Prime Minister Sztójay on August 29, the same day the Slovak National uprising against the Nazis started.

Despite the change of government, Hungarian troops occupied parts of Southern Transylvania, Romania, and massacred hundreds of Jews in Kissármás (Sărmașu; Sărmașu massacre), Marosludas (Luduș; Luduș massacre) and other places starting September 4.

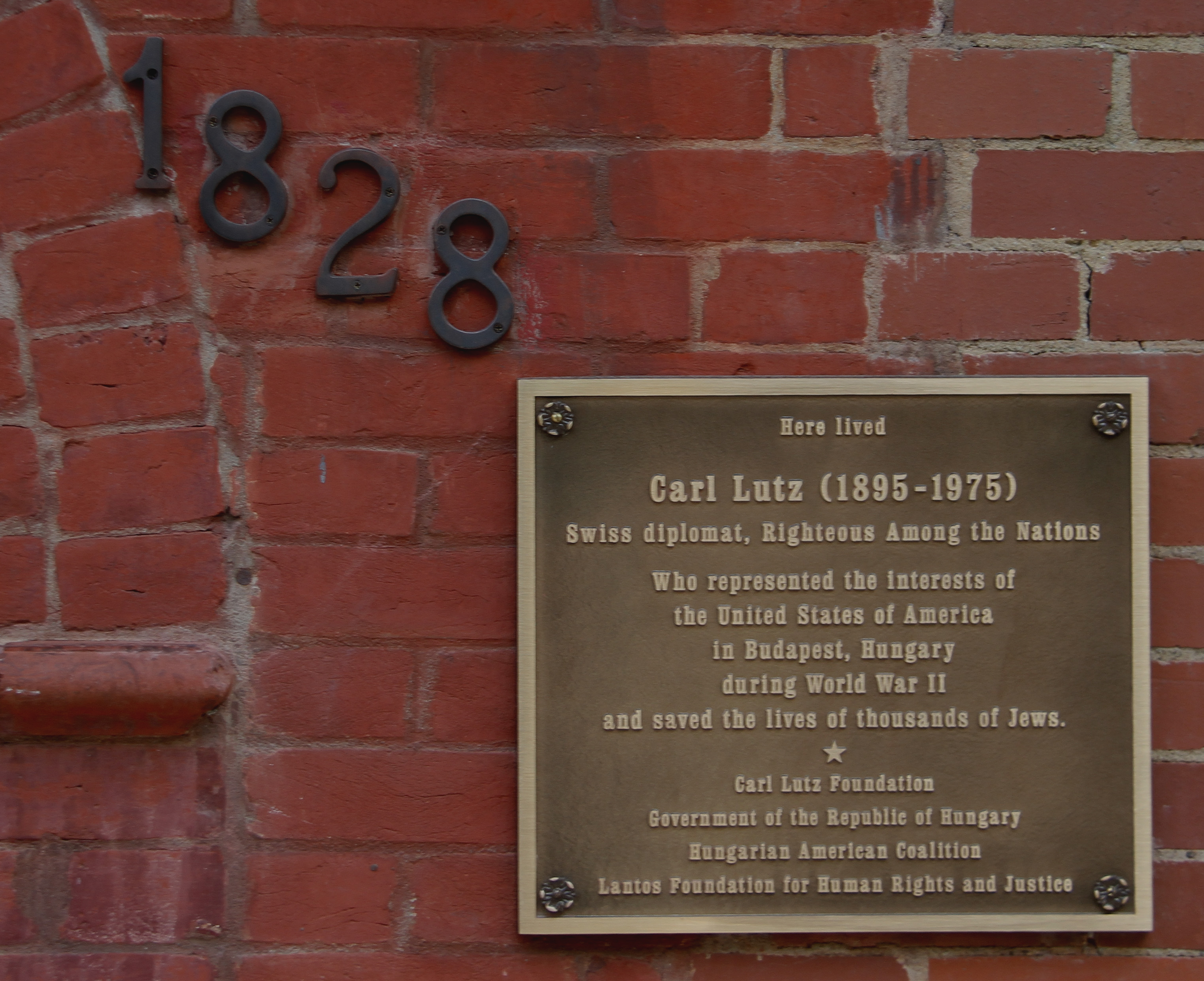
A Memorial plaque for Carl Lutz, a Swiss diplomat who saved the lives of tens of thousands of Hungarian Jews during the Holocaust.

=== Arrow Cross rule ===
After the Nyilaskeresztes (Arrow Cross) coup d'état on October 15, tens of thousands of Jews of Budapest were sent on foot to the Austrian border in death marches, most forced laborers under Hungarian Army command so far were deported (for instance to Bergen-Belsen), and two ghettos were set up in Budapest. The small "international ghetto" consisted of several "starred" houses under the protection of neutral powers in the Újlipótváros district. Switzerland was allowed to issue 7,800 Schutzpasses, Sweden 4,500, and the Vatican, Portugal, and Spain 3,300 combined. The big Budapest ghetto was set up and walled in the Erzsébetváros part of Budapest on November 29. Nyilas raids and mass executions occurred in both ghettos regularly. In addition, in the two months between November 1944 and February 1945, the Nyilas shot 10,000–15,000 Jews on the banks of the Danube. Soviet troops liberated the big Budapest ghetto on January 18, 1945. On the Buda side of the town, the encircled Nyilas continued their murders until the Soviets took Buda on February 13.

The names of some diplomats, Raoul Wallenberg, Carl Lutz, Ángel Sanz Briz, Giorgio Perlasca, Carlos Sampaio Garrido, and Carlos de Liz-Texeira Branquinho deserve mentioning, as well as some members of the army and police who saved people (Pál Szalai, Károly Szabó, and other officers who took Jews out from camps with fake papers), an Interior Ministry official (Béla Horváth) and some church institutions and personalities. Rudolf Kastner deserves special attention because of his enduring negotiations with Adolf Eichmann and Kurt Becher to prevent deportations to Auschwitz, succeeding only minimally by sending Jews to still horrific labor battalions in Austria and ultimately saving 1,680 Jews in Kastner's train.

=== Number of survivors ===
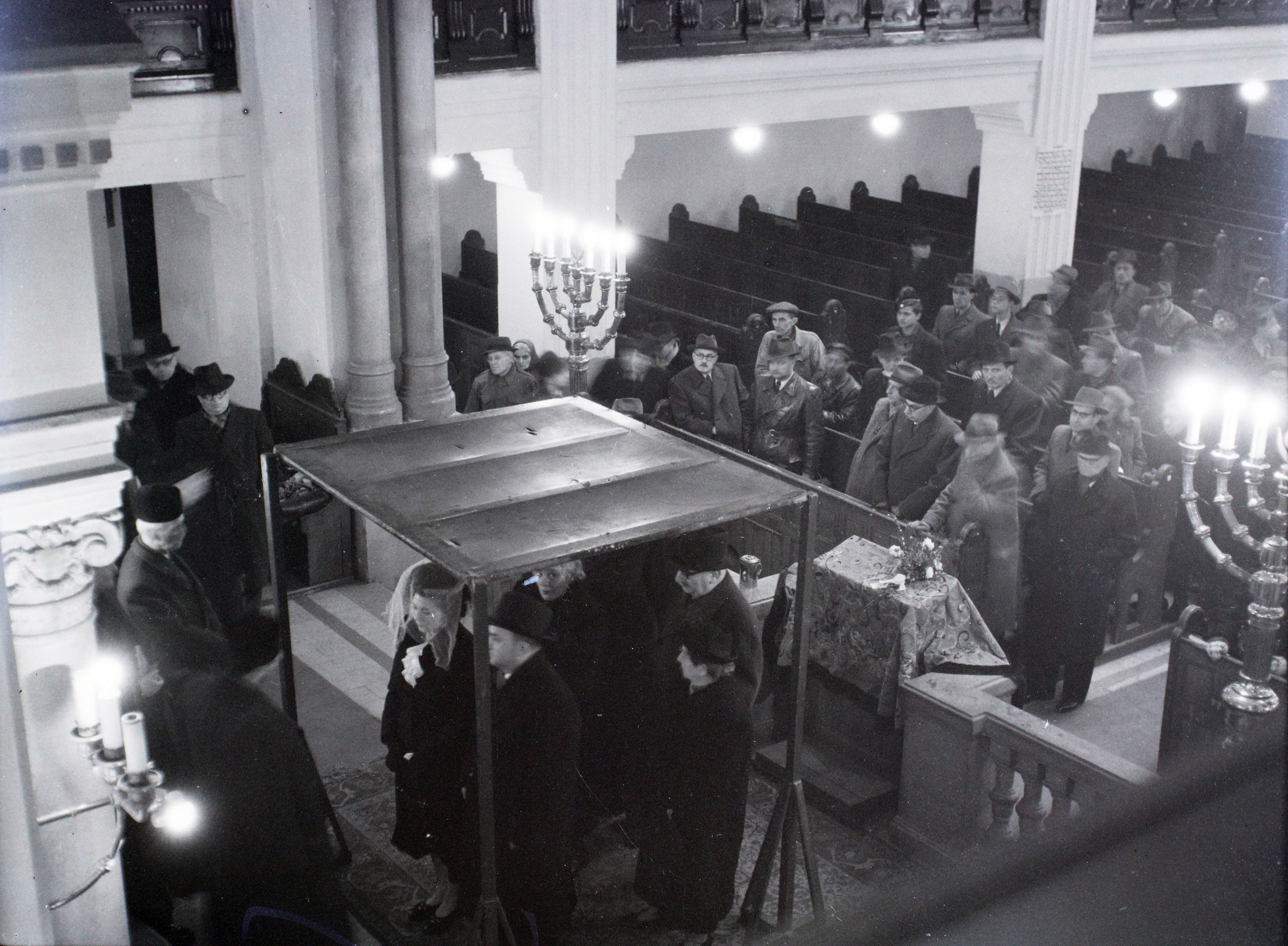
Jewish wedding at the Hegedus Gyula Synagogue in Budapest in 1946

An estimated 119,000 Jewish people were liberated in Budapest (25,000 in the small "international" ghetto, 69,000 in the big ghetto, and 25,000 hiding with false papers) and 20,000 forced laborers in the countryside. Almost all the surviving deportees returned between May and December 1945, at least to check out the fate of their families. Their number was 116,000. It is estimated that from an original population of 861,000 people considered Jewish inside the borders of 1941–1944, about 255,000 survived. This gives a 29.6 percent survival rate. According to another calculation, Hungary's Jewish population at the time of the German invasion was 800,000, of which 365,000 survived.

== Communist rule ==
Hungarian Jewish population
Year	Pop.	±%
1920	473,400	—
1930	444,567	−6.1%
1939	400,000	−10.0%
1945	165,000	−58.8%
1951	130,000	−21.2%
1960	80,000	−38.5%
1970	70,000	−12.5%
1980	65,000	−7.1%
1990	57,000	−12.3%
2000	52,000	−8.8%
2010	48,600	−6.5%

At the end of World War II, only 140,000 Jews remained in Hungary, down from 750,000 in 1941. The difficult economic situation coupled with the lingering antisemitic attitude of the population prompted a wave of migration. Between 1945 and 1949, 40,000–50,000 Jews left Hungary for Israel (30,000–35,000) and Western countries (15,000–20,000). Between 1948 and 1951 14,301 Hungarian Jews immigrated to Israel, and after 1951 exit visas became increasingly expensive and restrictive. People of Jewish origin dominated the post-war Communist regime until 1952–53 when many were removed in a series of purges. During its first years, the regime's top membership and secret police were almost entirely Jewish, albeit naturally anti-religious. Leaders like Mátyás Rákosi, Ernő Gerő and Peter Gabor repudiated Judaism and were strict atheists per Communist doctrine. Indeed, under Communist rule from 1948 to 1988, Zionism was outlawed and Jewish observance was curtailed. Moreover, members of the upper class, Jews and Christians alike, were expelled from the cities to the provinces for 6–12 months in the early 1950s.

Jews were on both sides of the 1956 uprising. Some armed rebel leaders like István Angyal, an Auschwitz survivor executed on December 1, 1958, were Jewish. Jewish writers and intellectuals such as Tibor Déry, imprisoned from 1957 to 1961, occupied the forefront of the reform movement. After the Hungarian Revolution of 1956, about 20,000 or so Jews fled the country. About 9,000 went to Israel while others settled in the United States, Canada, Australia, Western Europe, and Latin America. An estimated 20% of the Hungarian refugees entering Canada in 1957 were Jewish. The Hungarian Jewish population declined both because of emigration and because of high levels of assimilation and intermarriage and low birth rates. The Jews with the strongest Jewish identities were typically the ones who emigrated. By 1967, only about 80,000–90,000 Jews (including non-religious Jews) remained in the country, with the number dropping further before the country's Communist regime collapsed in 1989.

Under the milder communist regime of János Kádár (ruled 1957–1988) leftist Jewish intelligentsia remained an important and vocal part of Hungarian art and sciences. Diplomatic relations with Israel were severed in 1967 following the Six-Day War, but it was not followed by antisemitic campaigns as in Poland or the Soviet Union.

== From the 1990s ==
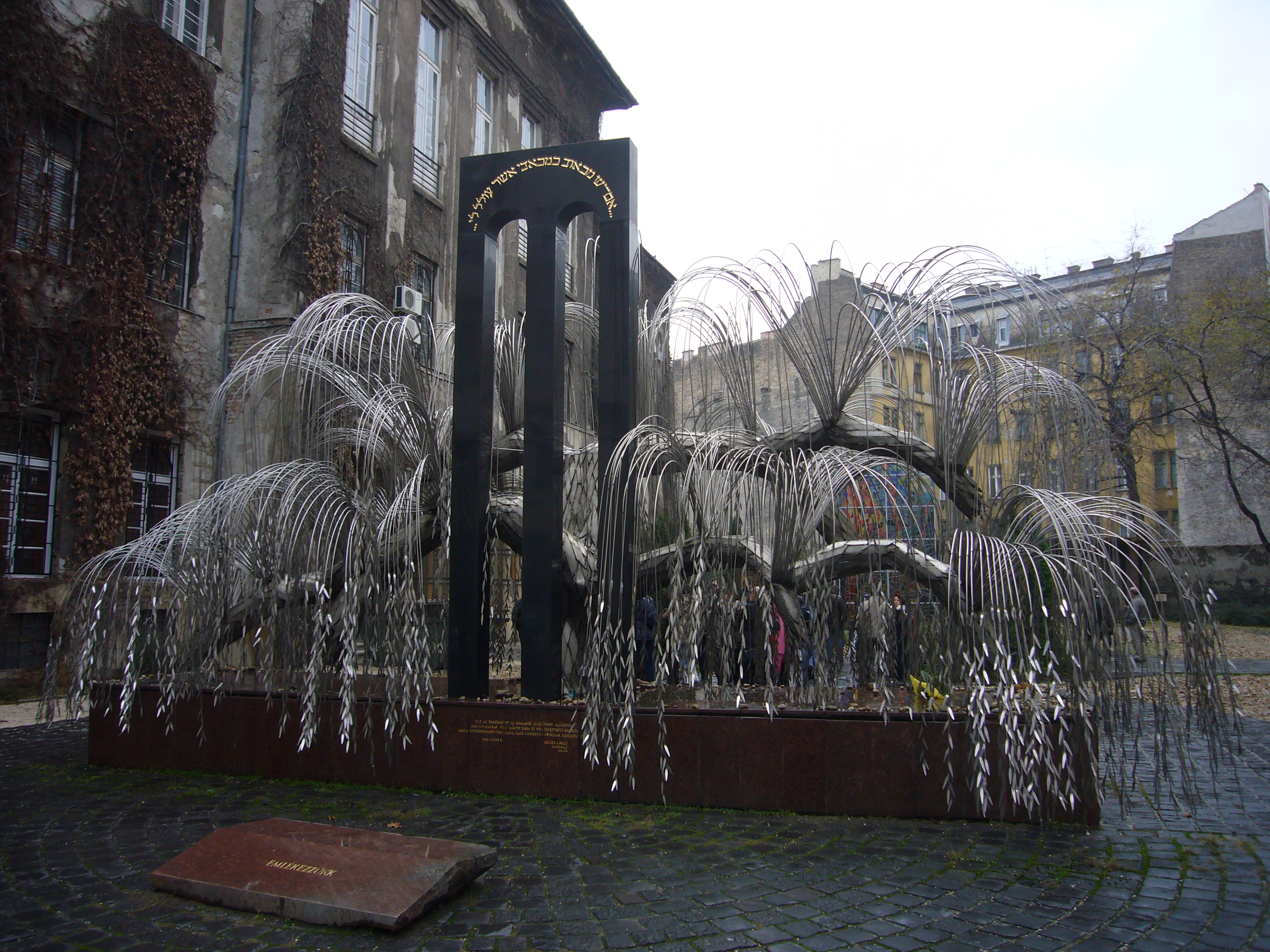
The weeping willow monument in Budapest to Hungarian victims of the Holocaust. Each leaf is inscribed with the family name of one of the victims.

Hungary's Jewish population (within its current borders) decreased from nearly half a million after World War I and kept declining between 1920 and 2010, significantly between 1939 and 1945 (World War II and the Holocaust), and further between 1951 and 1960 (the Hungarian Revolution of 1956). Despite the decline, in 2010 Hungary had the largest Jewish population in Eastern Europe outside the former Soviet Union.

In the aftermath of the Cold War and during its democratic transition, Hungary played a pivotal role in supporting the emigration of Soviet Jews. From 1989 to 1991, more than 160,000 Soviet Jewish refugees passed through Hungary en route to Israel. This large-scale transit was made possible by a collaboration between the Jewish Agency and Malév Hungarian Airlines, which operated a makeshift air corridor from Moscow to Tel Aviv via Budapest. Hungary’s political elites — both outgoing Communists and emerging democrats — supported this operation as part of the country's realignment with Western democratic norms and its renewed relationship with Israel. Despite facing terrorist threats and domestic political tensions, Hungary maintained its role as a key transit hub during this period.

After the fall of communism, Hungary had two prime ministers of partial Jewish origin, József Antall (1990–1993) and Gyula Horn (1994–1998)

In April 1997, the Hungarian parliament passed a Jewish compensation act that returns property stolen from Jewish victims during the Nazi and Communist eras. Under this law, property and monetary payment were given back to the Jewish public heritage foundation and to Jewish victims of the Holocaust.

Critics have asserted that the sums represent nothing more than a symbolic gesture. According to Randolph L. Braham: "The overshadowing of the Holocaust by a politically guided preoccupation with the horrors of the Communist era has led, among other things, to giving priority to the compensation of the victims of Communism over those of Nazism. To add insult to injury, an indeterminate number of the Christian victims who were compensated for properties nationalized by the Communist regime had, in fact, 'legally' or fraudulently acquired them from Jews during the Nazi era. Compounding this virtual obscenity, the government of Viktor Orbán sought in late 1998 to ease the collective conscience of the nation by offering to compensate survivors by paying approximately $150 for each member of their particular immediate families, assuming that they can prove that their loved ones were in fact victims of the Holocaust."

== See also ==
- List of Hungarian Jews
- Antisemitism in contemporary Hungary
- Arrow Cross Party
- Budapest Ghetto
- History of Hungary
- History of the Jews in Bekes (Hungary)
- History of the Jews in Carpathian Ruthenia
- Hungary in World War II
- Category:Hungarian-Jewish diaspora
- Kiryat Mattersdorf
- Miskolc pogrom
- Neolog Judaism
- Oberlander Jews
- Religion in Hungary
- Freedom of religion in Hungary
- Shoes on the Danube Promenade
- Siebengemeinden
- Batei Ungarin
- Unsdorf
