= Kastner trial =

Libel case in Jerusalem, Israel

Attorney-General v. Gruenwald
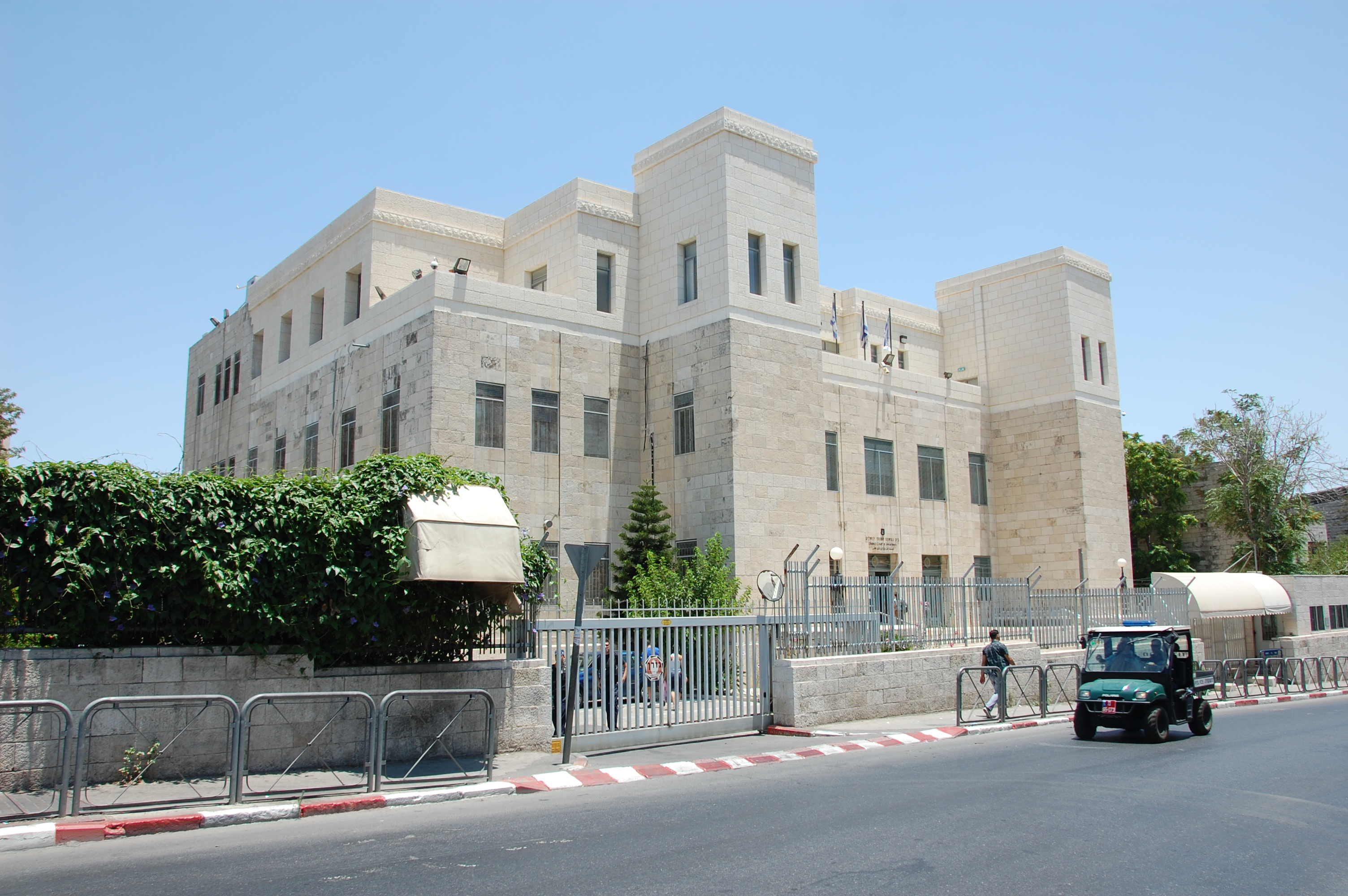
- Court: Jerusalem District Court
- Full case name: The Attorney-General of the Government of Israel v. Malchiel Gruenwald
- Decided: 22 June 1955

Case history
- Appealed to: Supreme Court of Israel

Court membership
- Judge sitting: Judge Benjamin Halevi

The Attorney-General of the Government of Israel v. Malchiel Gruenwald, commonly known as the Kastner trial, was a libel case in Jerusalem, Israel. Hearings were held from 1 January to October 1954 in the District Court of Jerusalem before Judge Benjamin Halevi (1910–1996), who published his decision on 22 June 1955.

== Summary ==
The defendant, Malchiel Gruenwald (1882–1968), a hotelier who lost 52 relatives in the Auschwitz concentration camp, had accused Rudolf Kastner (1906–1957), a Hungarian lawyer and journalist who became a civil servant in Israel in 1947, of collaborating with the Nazis in Hungary during the Holocaust. The allegations were made in a self-published newsletter, Letter to Friends in the Mizrachi, in August 1952.

The Israeli government sued on Kastner's behalf, calling him as one of 59 witnesses. Gruenwald was represented by Shmuel Tamir (1923–1987), a former Irgun commander, who turned the case into one that examined the actions of the governing Zionist Mapai party during the Holocaust, and what had been done to help Europe's Jews. One of the key issues was whether Kastner, who in Hungary had helped to found the Budapest Aid and Rescue Committee, had in effect collaborated with Adolf Eichmann (1906–1962) and Kurt Becher (1909–1995), two SS officers, in his efforts to secure safe passage from Budapest to Switzerland in July 1944 of 1,684 Jews, on what became known as the Kastner train.

Gruenwald and Tamir accused Kastner of having failed to warn the Hungarian Jewish community that they were to be loaded onto trains and taken to the gas chambers in Auschwitz, in occupied Poland. They alleged that he had known about the gas chambers since at least the end of April 1944 – when he had received a copy of the Vrba-Wetzler report – but had neglected to inform the wider community that they were not being deported from Hungary to be "resettled," as the Nazis had said. His motive, they said, was to safeguard the release of a smaller number, which included his family and friends. In failing to alert the wider community to the danger, they alleged that he had helped the SS avoid the spread of panic among the Jewish community, which would have slowed down the transports. The judge ruled in Gruenwald's favour, accusing Kastner of having "sold his soul to the devil." Kastner was assassinated outside his home in Tel Aviv in March 1957 as a result of the decision and the subsequent publicity.

== Appeal ==
Most of the decision was overturned by the Supreme Court of Israel in January 1958. The five judges, Chief Justice Yitzhak Olshan, Shimon Agranat, Moshe Silberg, Shneur Zalman Cheshin, and David Goitein, upheld the appeal on the charge that Kastner was guilty of the indirect murder of Hungarian Jews. Cheshin wrote: "On the basis of the extensive and diverse material which was compiled in the course of the hearing, it is easy to describe Kastner as blacker than black and place the mark of Cain on his forehead, but it is also possible to describe him as purer than the driven snow and regard him as 'the righteous of our generation.' A man who exposed himself to mortal danger in order to save others."

Three of the judges, with Silberg dissenting, also upheld the appeal on the charge that Kastner was guilty of collaboration. According to Asher Maoz, Silberg agreed with the trial judge that Kastner had "knowingly and in bad faith, fulfilled the wishes ... of the Nazis, and thereby made it easier for them to perform the work of mass destruction." All five judges dismissed the appeal related to the charge that Kastner had helped Kurt Becher escape punishment after the war by writing him a letter of recommendation.

== See also ==
- Perfidy, a book about the trial
