= Rezső Kasztner =

Hungarian-Jewish lawyer and journalist (1906–1957)

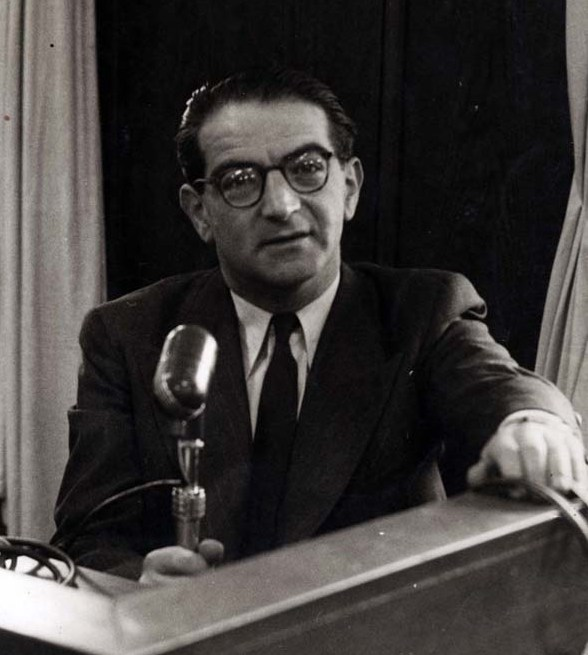
- In the early 1950s
- Born: 1906; Kolozsvár, Austria-Hungary
- Died: March 15, 1957 (aged 51); Tel Aviv, Israel
- Cause of death: Gunshot wounds
- Resting place: Nahalat Yitzhak Cemetery
- Other names: Rudolf Kastner, Israel or Yisrael Kasztner.
- Education: Law degree
- Occupations: Lawyer, journalist with Új Kelet in Budapest, civil servant in Israel
- Known for: Saving 1,684 Jews on the Kastner train, who were otherwise destined for Auschwitz
- Political party: Mapai
- Spouse(s): Elizabeth, née Fischer
- Children: Zsuzsi
- Parent(s): Yitzhak and Helen Kasztner

Rezső Kasztner (Hungarian pronunciation: [ˈkastnɛr ˈrɛʒøː]; 1906 – 15 March 1957), also known as Rudolf Israel Kastner (Hebrew: רודולף ישראל קסטנר), was a Hungarian-Israeli journalist and lawyer who became known for having helped a group of Jews escape from occupied Europe during the Holocaust on the Kastner train. After World War II, he was accused of having failed to inform the majority of Hungarian Jews about the reality of what awaited them in Auschwitz. He was assassinated in 1957 after an Israeli court accused him of having "sold his soul to the devil," a charge that was overturned by the Supreme Court of Israel in 1958.

Kasztner was one of the leaders of the Budapest Aid and Rescue Committee (Va'adat Ezrah Vehatzalah, or Vaada), which smuggled Jewish refugees into Hungary during World War II. When the Nazis invaded Hungary in March 1944, he helped refugees escape. Between May and July 1944, Hungarian Jews were deported to the gas chambers at Auschwitz at the rate of 12,000 a day. Kasztner negotiated with Adolf Eichmann, a senior SS officer and a mastermind of the Holocaust, to allow 1,684 Jews to leave instead for Switzerland on what became known as the Kastner train, in exchange for money, gold, and diamonds.

Kasztner moved to Israel after the war, becoming a spokesman for the Ministry of Trade and Industry in 1952. In 1953 he was accused of having been a Nazi collaborator in a pamphlet self-published by freelance writer Malchiel Gruenwald. The allegation stemmed from Kasztner's relationship with Eichmann and another SS officer, Kurt Becher, and from his having given positive character references after the war for Becher and two other SS officers, thus allowing Becher to escape prosecution for war crimes. The Israeli government sued Gruenwald for libel on Kasztner's behalf, resulting in a trial that lasted 18 months, and a ruling in 1955 that Kasztner had, in the words of Judge Benjamin Halevy, "sold his soul to the devil".

By saving the Jews on the "Kasztner train", while failing to warn others that their "resettlement" was in fact deportation to the gas chambers, Kasztner had sacrificed the mass of Jewry for a chosen few, the judge said. The verdict triggered the fall of the Israeli Cabinet.

Kasztner resigned his government position and became a virtual recluse, telling reporters he was living with a loneliness "blacker than night, darker than hell". His wife fell into a depression that left her bedridden, while his daughter's schoolmates threw stones at her in the street.

Kasztner was shot on March 3, 1957, by Zeev Eckstein, part of a three-man squad from a group of veterans from the pre-state militia Lehi led by Yosef Menkes and Yaakov Heruti, and died of his injuries 12 days later. The Supreme Court of Israel overturned two of the charges against Kasztner in January 1958 in a 4–1 decision, finding that he had tried to negotiate the release of as many people as he could and had acted on the assumption that it would cause more harm than good to tell the Jews bound for Auschwitz of the mass murders taking place there. However, the Supreme Court unanimously upheld the charge stemming from Kasztner’s post-war assistance of SS officer Kurt Becher.

== Early life ==
=== Childhood ===
Kasztner was born in 1906 in Kolozsvár (Yiddish: קלויזנבורג, Kloiznborg; German: Klausenburg) in Austria-Hungary (today Cluj-Napoca, Romania), into a local community of 15,000 Jews. The governance of the city was unstable, moving back and forth between Hungary and Romania. It became Cluj, Romania in 1920, was returned to Hungary in 1940, then was restored to Romania by the Treaty of Paris in 1947, after the Soviet and Romanian armies defeated German and Hungarian forces in the winter of 1944–45.

Kasztner was raised with his two brothers in a two-story brick house in the southern part of the city by his father, Yitzhak, a merchant and a devout man who spent most of his day in the synagogue, and his mother, Helen, who ran the family store.

=== Education ===
Helen decided that her sons should attend a regular high school, rather than a Jewish one, as the curriculum was broader and included languages. By the time Kasztner graduated, he spoke eight languages: Hungarian, Romanian, French, German, and Latin, along with Yiddish, Hebrew, and Aramaic.

Anna Porter writes that he became known for his good looks, sharp mind, quick wit, and his intense focus, as a result of which his mother decided that he should study law, though his heart was in politics.

While Kolozsvár was still controlled by Hungary, Jewish entry to universities had been limited by the 1920 Numerus Clausus (closed number) Act, which was the first antisemitic legislation in 20th-century Europe. The law limited Jewish university enrollment to 6%, reflecting Jews' portion of the population, and although Kolozsvár became part of Romania shortly after, and the legislation itself was allowed to lapse eight years later in Hungary, it affected Kasztner's teenage political orientation, and he decided at the age of 15 to become a Zionist.

He joined a Zionist youth group, Barissa, which trained its members to become citizens of the Land of Israel, becoming its leader within a year. His older brother, Gyula, had already emigrated to Mandatory Palestine in 1924 to work on a kibbutz, but Kasztner was still in high school and so unable to go with him. He played his part in the Zionist movement by writing articles on British policies in Palestine for the local Jewish newspaper Új Kelet.

=== Early career ===
When Kasztner was 22, his father died reading the Torah in the synagogue on the seventh day of Passover. He had to put off any ideas about emigrating, as his mother now needed him at home. He attended law school, as she wished, then worked full-time for Új Kelet after graduating, at first working as a sports reporter, though he continued to write about politics. He also became an assistant to Dr. József Fischer, a lawyer, member of Parliament, president of the Jewish Community of Kolozsvár, and leading member of the National Jewish Party. Fischer admired Kasztner's writing, and encouraged him to continue working for Új Kelet too.

Porter writes that Fischer may have been the only person whose intelligence Kasztner respected. He was known for not suffering fools gladly, dismissing people as stupid or intellectual cowards. "He had no sense of other people's sensitivities, or he didn't care whether he alienated his friends," Dezsö Hermann, one of Kasztner's friends at law school, told Porter. "Back then, in Kolozsvár, Jews kept their heads down. Not Rezső."

Ladislaus Löb quotes Kasztner's associate Joel Brand as saying that Kasztner was the "prototype of the snobbish intellectual" but showed "marvellous courage at critical moments"; the Orthodox leader Fülöp Freudiger called him "dictatorial" but "selfless and always willing to take personal risks". Kasztner's daughter, Zsuzsi, described him as "very arrogant, and rightly so, because he was extremely smart and intelligent and handsome and charismatic".

He became known as a political fixer, knowing whom to bribe, how much to pay, whom to flatter. He interviewed leading politicians for Új Kelet, and even antisemitic members of the Iron Guard. He worked hard as a lawyer for his clients, reportedly knowing when to pay off the police so that charges would be dropped. He married József Fischer's daughter, Elizabeth, in 1934, which further cemented his position locally.

== Refugee work ==
=== Rise of Nazism ===
As the German army moved across Europe, Kasztner set up an information center in Cluj to help refugees arriving from Austria, Poland, and Slovakia. He arranged temporary accommodation for them and collected clothes and food from local charities. His main concern was to provide Jewish refugees with safe passage, using his ability to bribe and charm to obtain exit visas from the Romanian government. He asked for help from the Jewish Agency's leadership in Tel Aviv, though there was a limit to what they could do because the British had imposed strict quotas on the number of Jewish refugees allowed into Palestine, causing Kasztner to attack "Perfidious Albion" in Új Kelet.

On August 30, 1940, the Second Vienna Award returned Cluj to Hungarian control, becoming once again Kolozsvár. The city's Jews were glad at first, reasoning that Hungary's Jews had not been subjected to the same random killings experienced by Jews in Romania. Hungarian Jews were patriots, viewing themselves as Hungarians first, Jews second, and Hungary as their homeland, not Eretz Israel. Their jubilation was short-lived. As Germany's influence over Hungarian policies increased, Jews found themselves subjected to antisemitic legislation and violence. In 1941, the Hungarian government closed all Jewish newspapers, including Új Kelet. Kasztner, then 36 years old, decided to move to Budapest to look for a job, leaving his wife behind in Kolozsvár.

=== Move to Budapest ===
Kasztner rented a small, two-room apartment in a pension in Váci Street. He wanted to continue his work helping Jewish refugees in Kolozsvár, and with that in mind, had obtained a letter of introduction from József Fischer to Ottó Komoly, an engineer and president of the Budapest Zionist Association. Komoly directed Kasztner to Miklós (Moshe) Krausz, the Jewish Agency's representative in Budapest, who controlled the Palestine entry visas.

Porter writes that Kasztner had to wait in line for two hours at the Agency's office on Erzsébet Boulevard, among scores of Jewish refugees desperate to find a way to escape to Palestine. He eventually barged past Krausz's secretaries and into his office. Krausz explained that he was determined not to alienate the British, which meant that every entry visa had to be legitimate and properly processed, which was consuming all his time. Kasztner offered to help, but Krausz was not interested. Porter writes that Krausz took an instant dislike to the "forceful, loud, and insistent Kasztner."

Kasztner's wife joined him in Budapest in July 1941. He tried to persuade Dr. Fischer, who had lost his law practice, to join them but Fischer refused, feeling responsible for the Jewish community in Kolozsvár. Komoly continued to introduce Kasztner to key figures in the Budapest Zionist movement, one of whom was Sam Springmann, who was bribing officials – in part with money from the Jewish Agency – to carry messages and food parcels into Łódź and other ghettos in Poland. It was Springmann who introduced Kasztner to Joel Brand, a meeting that was to change both their lives.

=== Negotiations ===
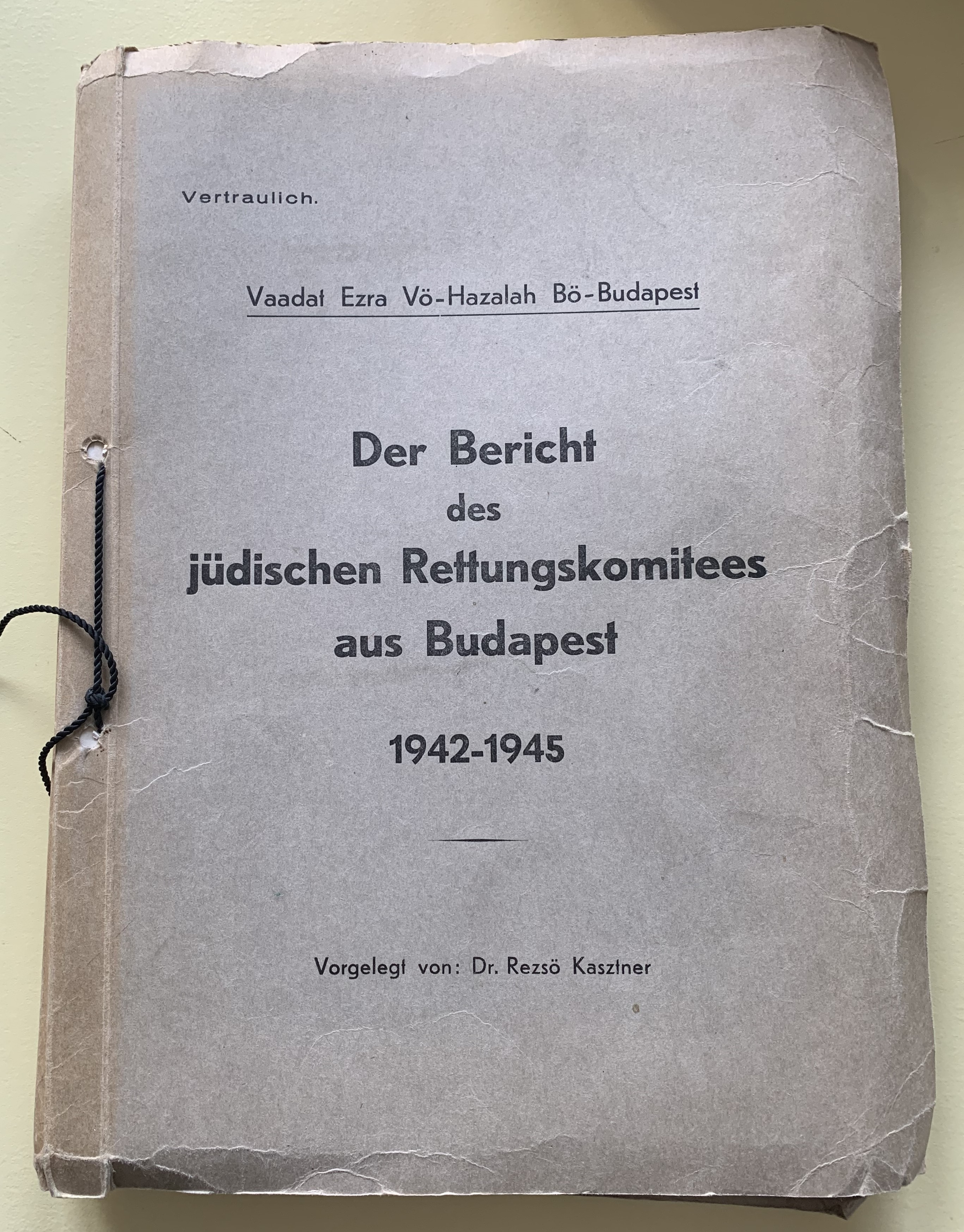
Kasztner Report (1942-1945), original document from the Federal Parliament in Bern, in the collection of the Jewish Museum of Switzerland.

During the summer of 1944, Kasztner repeatedly met with Adolf Eichmann, who was in charge of deporting Hungary's 800,000-strong Jewish community to Auschwitz in occupied Poland. He was introduced to Eichmann by two Jews involved in rescue: Joel Brand and possibly his wife Hansi Brand. Soon thereafter Eichmann sent Joel Brand to Turkey to negotiate the Goods for Blood affair.

They reached an agreement that some 1,685 Jews would be spared for a price of $1,000 per head. Most of the passengers could not raise the funds themselves, so Kasztner auctioned off 150 places to wealthy Jews in order to pay for the others.

In addition, SS officer Kurt Becher, Heinrich Himmler's envoy, insisted that 50 seats be reserved for the families of individuals who had personally paid him for favors, at the sum of approximately $25,000 per person. Becher wanted to get the price per head increased to $2,000 but Himmler set the price at $1,000. The total value of the ransom was estimated by the Jewish community to be 8,600,000 Swiss francs, ($2,494,000 USD) though Becher himself valued it at only 3,000,000 Swiss francs ($870,000 USD.)

Breaking his agreement, Eichmann had the passengers on the train sent to Belsen concentration camp. However, in the end, the passengers were saved by being transported to neutral Switzerland in two contingents, in August and December 1944 respectively.

They included the Rabbi Joel Teitelbaum, the writer Béla Zsolt, the psychiatrist Leopold Szondi, the opera singer Dezső Ernster, the artist István Irsai, and other intellectuals, scientists, religious leaders, and political activists, but also people who were neither rich nor prominent, not least a group of Polish orphans. Large number of passengers were ultimately released after a ransom payment arranged by Yitzchak Sternbuch, a Swiss Orthodox Jew and Recha Sternbuch's husband.

Alfréd Wetzler (aka Jozef Lánik) and Rudolf Vrba (born as Walter Rosenberg) escaped from Auschwitz after learning that construction and preparations were being made for the mass arrival of "Hungarian Salami", as those Jews were jokingly called by the camp guards, and wrote the Vrba-Wetzler report, also known as the Auschwitz Protocol, with help from the Bratislava Working Group. It was distributed to many Jewish and other organizations, including the Jewish Agency, in order to warn the Hungarian Jews. The recipients did not publicize the report.

Vrba claimed that Kasztner deliberately buried the report, because it would ruin his Blood for Goods plan. Kasztner's detractors allege that Kasztner and other members of the Aid and Rescue Committee helped the SS encourage Hungarian Jewry to board the trains bound for Auschwitz voluntarily, telling them that they would be brought to Kenyérmező and given jobs in factories and fields; and that as a result of this misinformation from their leaders, Hungarian Jewry was delivered to Auschwitz. Professor Eli Reichenthal wrote that Kasztner at that stage was actually being blackmailed by the Germans, as his parents, friends and close family were all on the "Kastner train" stranded in the Bergen-Belsen concentration camp. Holocaust historian Prof. David Kranzler stated that Kasztner implored George Mantello (Mandel), then First Secretary of El Salvador in Switzerland, not to publicize the content of the report.

Kasztner's defenders claim that as a result of his negotiations, an additional 15,000 Hungarian Jews were transferred to labor camps at Strasshof rather than being murdered at Auschwitz. However, Eichmann testified at his trial that this was an act of deceit on his part: "It is possible that I painted a bright picture for Kasztner."

=== Hannah Szenes and the Jewish paratroopers from Palestine ===
While negotiations about the first train were continuing, three Jewish Special Operations Executive members from Palestine, Hannah Szenes and two men, Yoel Palgi and Peretz Goldstein, were parachuted into Yugoslavia and attempted to penetrate the Hungarian border. They were caught by the Hungarian underground police. Szenes was taken to prison, interrogated in front of her imprisoned mother, and later killed, while the other two were brought to Kasztner, who convinced the two to go to the German Gestapo and inform them that they were Jewish fighters from Palestine who wish to confirm the 'Blood for Goods' deal, but ask that it reach Switzerland instead of Palestine.

The two were incarcerated by the Germans, tortured, and sent to Germany, but Palgi jumped the train en route and escaped.

During the later Kastner trial, Hannah Szenes's mother told the court that Kasztner deceived her in such a way as to lead to suspicions that it was he who gave away her daughter's unit in the first place, and had her, the mother, imprisoned. Palgi accused Kasztner of leading them into a trap.

Shmuel Tamir, Gruenwald's attorney, claimed that this was one of the main reasons that he felt that Kasztner had been nothing more than a German collaborator, to save his family and perhaps for money. In Kasztner's defense, Eli Reichenthal says that at the point when the three paratroopers reached Budapest, what motivated Kasztner's decisions were the jeopardy to the deal (which Kasztner believed was real and therefore could save many more Jews) and Eichmann's blackmail (having Kasztner's family together with the Hungarian Zionist leadership on the train). This was something Kasztner could not reveal at the trial; "I had reasons" was his answer to Szenes's mother.

=== Auschwitz Protocols ===
In April 1944 Kasztner received in Bratislava the Vrba-Wetzler report and other evidence that Hungary's Jews would be murdered. The report was later released to the leaders of Jewish organizations in Budapest and elsewhere in the hope that Hungarian Jews would be warned that they were being deported to a death camp and were not being resettled, as they had been led to believe. However, the report was not made public by Kasztner, the Jewish Council (Judenrat) in Hungary or other Jewish organizations.

George Mantello (Mandel), an Orthodox Jew from Hungary and first secretary of the El Salvador mission to Switzerland, sent a Romanian diplomat friend, Florian Manoliu, to find out what was happening to his family, who by then had been murdered. Manoliu stopped over in Budapest at risk to himself, and on 19 June 1944 obtained the abridged Auschwitz Protocols reports from Moshe Krausz representing the Jewish Agency in Budapest. Manoliu immediately returned with the reports to Geneva and Mantello publicized the details within a day of receiving them. This led to large-scale grassroots demonstrations in Switzerland and a very important Press Campaign with over 400 major articles in the Swiss press deploring Europe's barbarism toward Jews (published in spite of Swiss censorship rules), sermons in Swiss churches, and the publication of the book "Am I my Brother's Keeper?" (in German) by Pastor Paul Vogt, Switzerland's leading theologian. The resulting international outcry, including warnings to Hungary's ruler Miklós Horthy by Roosevelt and Churchill, was one of the main reasons that the Hungarian government stopped the deportations. By then, 437,000 Hungarian Jews had been taken to Auschwitz, most murdered on arrival.

Kasztner's critics also argued that he promised the SS not to warn Hungarian Jews to avoid jeopardizing negotiations to save the Jews who escaped on the Kastner train. In 1960, an interview with Eichmann, by the Dutch Nazi journalist Willem Sassen in Argentina, was published in Life Magazine. Eichmann said that Kasztner "agreed to help keep the Jews from resisting deportation – and even keep order in the collection camps – if I would close my eyes and let a few hundred or a few thousand young Jews emigrate to Palestine. It was a good bargain." Rudolf Vrba wrote, "Kasztner paid for those 1,684 lives with his silence."

Kasztner's supporters argued that the agreement over the train was part of a much larger rescue effort, involving negotiations to save all Hungarian Jews, and that he could not have saved Jews by warning them anyway. Löb argued, "With no access to the media and limited opportunities to travel, under constant observation by German and Hungarian secret police, he could hardly have raised the alarm in an effective way" and even if he had, the Jews, "surrounded by enemies, stripped of their rights and possessions, having neither the arms nor the experience", were unable to organise either resistance or mass escapes.

Kasztner's critics replied that he received SS permission to visit Kolozsvár/Cluj on May 3, 1944, but failed to warn the Jews there despite the fact that Cluj was only 3 miles (5 km) from the Romanian border and that the 20,000 Jews there were guarded by only 20 Hungarian gendarmes and an SS officer, and could have escaped. They also said that he could have telephoned other Jewish communities but did not, and that warnings might have enabled Jews to save their lives through "local uprisings, resistances, escapes, hiding, hiding children with Gentiles, forging documents, paying ransom, bribes" and other means.

From 1943, the BBC Polish Service had been broadcasting about the exterminations but the BBC Hungarian Service had not mentioned Jews. After the German invasion in March 1944, the Hungarian Service did broadcast warnings, but by then it was too late. According to David Cesarani and Götz Aly, although Jews who survived the deportations claimed that they had not been informed by their leaders, that no one had told them, there is plenty of evidence that Hungarian Jews could have known.

=== Reaction ===
The consequences of the meetings between Kasztner and Eichmann had long-lasting repercussions in the Israeli and Hungarian Jewish communities that are still felt. Part of these repercussions revolve around the fact that Kasztner helped to draw up the list of who was going to be among the Jews who were chosen to be saved and allowed to leave on a train. According to some sources, many of the Jews who were saved were Kasztner's relatives, rich Hungarian Jews who subsidized those on the train who could not pay, friends of Kasztner, as well as "community and Zionist leaders". The passengers included orphans, students, workmen, teachers and nurses.

=== Defense of Kurt Becher and other SS officers ===
In early 1945, Kasztner traveled to Germany with Becher, who had received the money and valuables paid to save the Jewish lives on the train. Himmler had ordered Becher to attempt to stop further exterminations at the concentration camps as the Allies gained further ground in the closing days of World War II. Even though Kasztner was a Hungarian Jew and Becher was head of the Economic Department of the SS, Kasztner and Becher worked well together. This 1945 action is credited by some for saving tens of thousands of Jewish lives [Ref. Anna Porter, "Kastner Train"].

At the conclusion of the war, Becher was arrested and investigated at Nuremberg as a war criminal. Kasztner intervened on his behalf and sent an affidavit to his de-Nazification hearing, stating that "[Becher is] cut from a different wood than the professional mass murderers of the political SS". It is likely that he did so with the knowledge and support of the Jewish Agency (Sochnut, Zionist leadership in Palestine, the Yishuv), from which he received a refund for expenses related to his trip to Nuremberg. It is theorized that this was done in the hope of obtaining help to recover stolen Jewish assets for Israel, receiving hidden weapons and capturing Eichmann in return. Kasztner later lied in court about having testified on Becher's behalf at Nuremberg trials, while he was asked about the affidavit. This defense of an SS officer angered the Jewish public as much as the original negotiations with Eichmann.

Kasztner also intervened on behalf of SS officers Hermann Krumey and Dieter Wisliceny, who had negotiated with him before his meetings with Eichmann. In all, "there was a total of seven interventions by Kasztner on behalf of Nazi war criminals. Three testimonies were on behalf of Becher, two were on behalf of Krumey, one was on behalf of Hans Jüttner, and there was an appeal that had the potential to deliver Wisliceny from the threat of execution in Slovakia." Wisliceny was hanged in 1948; Jüttner's 10-year prison sentence was changed to 4 years in 1949; he died in 1965. Krumey was sentenced to life imprisonment in 1969 and died in 1981. Becher died a wealthy man in 1995.

== Libel trial ==
Kasztner moved to Israel after the war, and became active in the Mapai party. He was an unsuccessful candidate in the first and second elections, and became the spokesman for the Ministry of Trade and Industry in 1952.

His role in collaborating with the SS made headlines in 1953, when he was accused in a self-published pamphlet produced by Malchiel Gruenwald of collaborating with the Nazis, enabling the mass murder of Hungarian Jewry, partnership with Nazi officer Kurt Becher in theft of Jewish assets, and saving Becher from punishment after the war.

Gruenwald was sued for libel by the Israeli government on Kasztner's behalf, resulting in a trial that lasted two years. Gruenwald's attorney, Shmuel Tamir, was a former Irgun member and supporter of the opposition Herut Party led by Menachem Begin. Tamir turned the libel case against his client into a political trial of Kasztner and, by implication, the Labor Party. The mother of wartime heroine Hannah Szenes had also accused Kasztner of betraying her daughter to her death and spoke out against him during the trial.

In his ruling, Judge Benjamin Halevi (later also a Herut member of the Knesset) acquitted Gruenwald of libel on the first, second and fourth counts. He wrote:

The temptation was great. Kasztner was given the actual possibility of rescuing, for the time being, 600 souls from the imminent holocaust, with some chance of somewhat increasing their numbers by payment or further negotiations. Not just any 600 souls, but those he considered, for any reason, most prominent and suitable for rescue...

But timeo Danaos et dona ferentes (I fear the Greeks even when they bring gifts). By accepting this present, Kasztner had sold his soul to the devil... The success of the rescue agreement depended until the last minute on the Nazi goodwill, and the last minute didn't arrive until long after the end of the extermination of the Jews in the provincial towns.

The Israeli government's decision to appeal on Kasztner's behalf led to its collapse, as Prime Minister Moshe Sharett resigned when the General Zionists, a member of his coalition, refused to abstain from voting on a no-confidence motion filed by Herut and Maki. Kasztner became a hated figure in Israel, and compared the verdict against him to the Dreyfus affair. He resigned his government position and started working for the Israeli Hungarian-language newspaper Új Kelet. He was assassinated in 1957.

The Supreme Court of Israel overturned most of the judgment against Kasztner in 1958. The judges overturned the first count by 3–2 and the second count by 5–0. The longest majority decision was written by Judge Shimon Agranat, who said:

1. During that period Kasztner was motivated by the sole motive of saving Hungary's Jews as a whole, that is, the largest possible number under the circumstances of time and place as he estimated could be saved.
2. This motive fitted the moral duty of rescue to which he was subordinated as a leader of the Relief and Rescue Committee in Budapest.
3. Influenced by this motive he adopted the method of financial or economic negotiation with the Nazis.
4. Kasztner's behavior stands the test of plausibility and reasonableness.
5. His behavior during his visit to Cluj (on May 3) and afterwards, both its active aspect (the plan of the "prominents") and its passive aspect (withholding the "Auschwitz news" and lack of encouragement for acts of resistance and escape on a large scale)—is in line with his loyalty to the method which he considered, at all important times, to be the only chance of rescue.
6. Therefore, one cannot find a moral fault in his behavior, one cannot discover a causal connection between it and the easing of the concentration and deportation, one cannot see it as becoming a collaboration with the Nazis.

But Judge Moshe Silberg disagreed on historical and moral grounds:

We can sum up with these three facts:

1. That the Nazis didn't want to have a great revolt — "Second Warsaw" — nor small revolts, and their passion was to have the extermination machine working smoothly without resistance. This fact was known to Kasztner from the very best source: Eichmann himself ...
2. That the most efficient means of paralyzing the resistance wheel or the escape of a victim is to conceal from him the plot of the coming murder ...
3. That he, Kasztner, in order to carry out the rescue plan for the few prominents, fulfilled knowingly and without good faith the stated desire of the Nazis, thus expediting the work of exterminating the masses.

All five Supreme Court Judges upheld Judge Halevi's verdict on the "criminal and perjurious way" in which Kasztner after the war had saved Nazi war criminal Becher. Judge Silberg summed up the Supreme Court finding on this point: "Greenwald has proven beyond any reasonable doubt this grave charge."

== Assassination and burial ==
Minutes after midnight on March 4, 1957, Kasztner was shot as he arrived at his Tel Aviv home. The attack was carried out by a three-man squad from a group of veterans from the pre-state politically mixed extremist underground group Lehi led by Yosef Menkes and Yaakov Heruti. Menkes had also been a member of the post-independence terrorist group Kingdom of Israel. The assassination squad consisted of Menkes (the leader), Ze'ev Eckstein (allegedly the shooter), and Dan Shemer (the driver). The three men waited in a jeep parked outside Kasztner's house. Eckstein disembarked and approached Kasztner as he locked his car, and asked him if he was Israel Kasztner. When Kasztner confirmed, Eckstein is said to have pulled out a handgun and fired three times. According to one opinion, the first shot missed, the second hit the car door, and the third hit Kasztner in the upper body, critically wounding him. Kasztner attempted to escape but died of his injuries on March 15.

In Gaylen Ross' 2008 film Killing Kasztner, Ze'ev Eckstein implied that someone else fired a fatal third bullet. The Kasztner family, also in the film, does not disagree although it has not been proven that it was someone else who did the shooting.

The Shin Bet security service has refused to have the Kasztner files opened despite Israel's Freedom of Information Act in court, claiming it would be harmful to national security by exposing the organisation's operational methods.

About an hour after the shooting, Shin Bet (Israel's internal security service) opened an investigation, focusing its efforts on the Lehi veterans group led by Menkes and Heruti. The group had been linked to various murder incidents and various actions against Kasztner, and it was suspected that Menkes bore personal responsibility. Kasztner described the assassins at the hospital and Shin Bet eventually identified Eckstein, Shemer, and Menkes as the assassins. Shemer was the first to confess, implicating Eckstein, who then confessed and implicated Menkes. Police tracked down the assassins' jeep, which was found to contain the murder weapon and Shemer's fingerprints. Subsequently, Heruti and 19 other members of their organisation were arrested and two weapons caches discovered.

Eckstein, then 24, stated that he tried to kill Kasztner to avenge his activities in conjunction with Nazi figures such as Adolf Eichmann.

During the trial it turned out that Eckstein had been a paid informer of Shin Bet a few months before the shooting. The idea that the killing was a government conspiracy has been described by Elliott Jager as "absolute nonsense", because the head of the intelligence service was a close personal friend of Kasztner. Others – including Ben Hecht in his book Perfidy – feel otherwise. At that time Kasztner, a high ranking government official, became a liability to the government and the trial led to collapse of the cabinet.

Kasztner's killers were given life sentences, but were pardoned after seven years. In January 1958 the Supreme Court of Israel overturned most of the judgment against Kasztner, stating that the lower court had "erred seriously" in putting the emphasis on Kasztner's moral conduct, leaving that "For history to judge."

In January 2015, Haaretz began publishing newly released documents relating to the assassination and its aftermath. Haaretz claims that the documents confirm that the Shin Bet knew that Kasztner was targeted and could back the conjecture "that the Shin Bet security service was involved in the murder of Kastner."

In an open letter by Tamir to the Tel Aviv municipality, which was planning to name a street after Kasztner, he stated that "Kasztner was never given exoneration", but rather that it was merely unproven whether his actions – which during the court case had been unanimously agreed upon as being despicable – had caused the murder or the failure to escape from Hungary of close to half a million Jews, deported and killed in the last months of the war. The court, he said, left that and only that to history.

Kasztner is buried alongside Elizabeth in Nahalat Yitzhak Cemetery.

== Descendants ==
Kasztner's daughter Zsuzsa lives in Tel Aviv, where she works as a hospital nurse. She has three daughters, including Merav Michaeli, a well-known radio and television presenter in Israel, and the leader of the Israeli Labor Party. In her inaugural speech to the Knesset, Michaeli described her grandfather as a man who saved "tens of thousands of Jews" by negotiating with Eichmann. Zsuzsa Kasztner and Michaeli attended the formal presentation of the Kasztner archive to Yad Vashem in 2007, and the former lectured about her father in Britain in 2008.

== Documentary ==
Gaylen Ross directed a feature-length theatrical documentary, Killing Kasztner, which was released in Israel, the United Kingdom and the United States in 2009. Reszo Kasztner was voiced by American actor, Larry Pine.

In the documentary, Ze'ev Eckstein states that after he fired a blank or a dud, Kasztner ran in the dark into the bushes by his building. Eckstein fired his two remaining bullets in Kasztner's direction and then heard a shot by someone else, when Kasztner cried out in pain. Eckstein thus implied that he was not the one who fired the fatal shot.

The film shows Eckstein at the Kasztner family apartment in Tel Aviv, where he was invited and met with the family. The atmosphere was not hostile.

== See also ==
- Hansi Brand
- Oskar Schindler
