= Perfidy (book) =

1961 book by Ben Hecht

- First edition
- Author: Ben Hecht
- Language: English
- Publisher: Messner
- Publication date: 1961

Perfidy is a book written by Ben Hecht in 1961. The book describes the events surrounding the 1954–1955 Kastner trial in Jerusalem.

The book is based on transcripts from the trial and concludes that in 1944 Rudolf Kastner deliberately withheld from the Jews in Hungary knowledge that the trains the Nazis were putting them on were taking them to death by the gas chamber, not to a fictitious resettlement city as the Nazis claimed and that Kastner then lied about it under oath. One of the supporting facts presented is that, in the Supreme Court appeal of the original verdict implicating Kastner, all five Supreme Court Judges upheld Judge Halevi's initial verdict on the "criminal and perjurious way" in which Kastner after the war had testified on behalf of Nazi war criminal Kurt Becher. Judge Silberg summed up the Supreme Court finding on this point: "[respondent Malchiel] Greenwald has proven beyond any reasonable doubt this grave charge." Most of the judgement was later overturned.

== Reception ==
In a 2007 Jerusalem Post opinion column, Elliot Jager called Perfidy "a devastating account" of Rudolf Kastner's betrayal of Hungarian Jewry. Jerome A. Chanes, writing for The Jewish Daily Forward in 2009, described Perfidy as an "ill-conceived and irresponsible anti-Kastner" account.

Deborah Lipstadt of Emory University says, "It is an amazing piece of writing, it's very passionate. It's not historical ... The problem is lots of the information in it is wrong!" She mentions Hecht's involvement with the Bergson boys and says, "much of what he's writing is Kastner as a foil for attacking Ben Gurion, for attacking the Labor Party, and he makes claims in there about the Labor Party, about Ben Gurion, not caring about what was going on in Europe, which is, again, historians now show, has simply not stood the test of time."

== See also ==
- Perdition (play)
