= Nine Suitcases =

Nine Suitcases may refer to:

- Nine Suitcases (book), a Holocaust memoir by Béla Zsolt
- Nine Suitcases (play), a 2011 one-man stage play, based on the book
