= Haim Cohn =

Israeli judge (1911–2002)

- חיים כהן
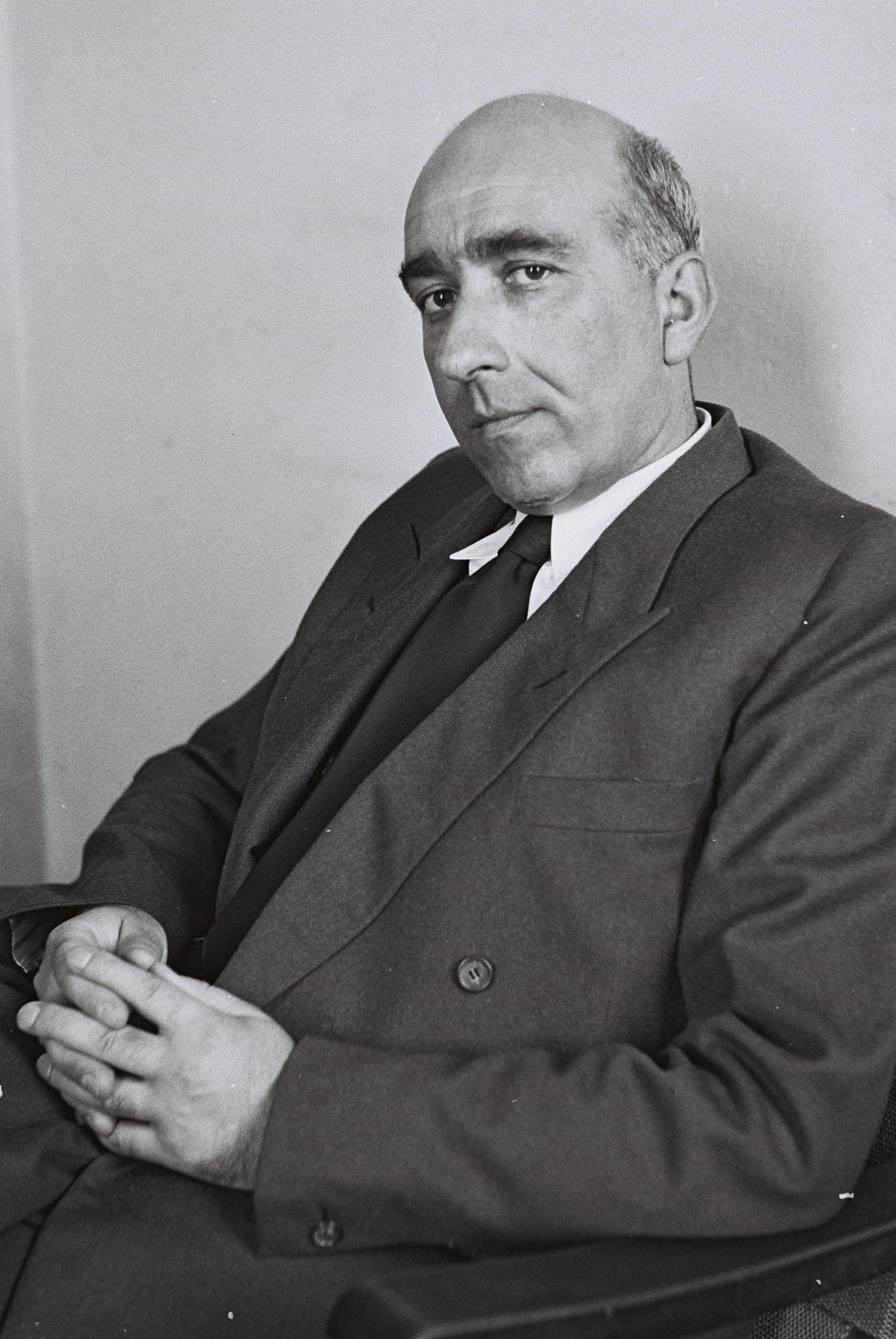

Ministerial roles
- 1952: Minister of Justice

Other roles
- 1949–1952: Director-General, Ministry of Justice
- 1950–1960: Attorney General
- 1960–1981: Supreme Court Justice
- 1955–1957 1965–1967: Israel’s representative, UN Human Rights Council
- 1962–1989: Member, International Court of Justice

Personal details
- Born: 11 March 1911 Lübeck, German Empire
- Died: 10 April 2002 (aged 91) Jerusalem, Israel
- Awards: Israel Prize (1980)

Haim Herman Cohn (Hebrew: חיים הרמן כהן; 11 March 1911 – 10 April 2002) was an Israeli jurist and politician.

== Biography ==
Haim Cohn was born in Lübeck, Germany in 1911 to a religious family. Haim was chairman of a World Agudath Israel branch in Hamburg. At age 18 he came to the British Mandate of Palestine to study at the Mercaz HaRav yeshiva in Jerusalem, where he studied under rabbi Abraham Isaac Kook. He was also a Hazzan in Mea Shearim. He returned to Germany to complete his law PhD at Frankfurt University. He emigrated to Palestine 1933 due to the rise of Nazism in Germany. In 1936 he was certified as a lawyer and the following year he opened an office in Jerusalem.

After the establishment of the State of Israel, he was appointed manager of the legislation department of the Ministry of Justice, and later became State Attorney. In 1949 he was made CEO of the Ministry of Justice and Attorney General of Israel a year later. As Attorney General, he decided to indict Malchiel Gruenwald, starting the Rudolf Kastner trial and decided to ignore the (British based) law "and refrained from pressing charges on the conduct of homosexual relations between consenting adults".

In 1952 he was also Minister of Justice, without being an MK. In 1960 he was appointed to the Supreme Court of Israel, a position he held until his retirement in 1981.

In addition to his civil service, he was also a visiting lecturer in the Tel Aviv University (from 1956 to 1969) and Hebrew University of Jerusalem (from 1954 to 1976) law schools, a representative of Israel in the United Nations Human Rights Council and a member of the International Court of Justice in The Hague. He was a member of the "T'hila" Movement for Israeli Jewish secularism.

He wrote five books, including The Trial and Death of Jesus in 1968, in which he argued that it was the Romans, not the Sanhedrin, who tried and executed Jesus.

Cohn's relationship with Orthodox Judaism was generally perceived as strained, however, in at least one instance, in 1975, Cohn was honored by Rabbi Menachem Mendel Schneerson of the Chabad-Lubavitch Hasidic dynasty with participation in the annual Simchat Torah ceremonies.

He died in 2002. President of the Supreme Court Aharon Barak cited him as one of the founders of Israeli law.

== Awards and honors ==
Cohn was awarded the 1980 Israel Prize in Law. He had also received honorary doctorates from several American universities, including Georgetown University.

== Selected publications ==
- Cohn, Haim (1980). The Trial and Death of Jesus. Ktav Pub Inc. ISBN 0-87068-432-9.
- Cohn, Haim Hermann; S. Giora Shoham (1971). Of Law and Man: Essays in Honor of Haim H. Cohn : Under the Auspices of the. Sabra Books. pp. 387. ISBN 0-87631-044-7.

== See also ==
- List of Israel Prize recipients
