= 21 Kislev =

Hasidic Festival

The 21st day of Kislev, known as Kuf Alef Kislev (Hebrew: כ׳׳א בכסלו) in Hungarian Yiddish pronunciation, is a day of celebration among the Satmar Hasidim. On this day of the Hebrew calendar, Rabbi Joel Teitelbaum was rescued from the Holocaust. The rabbi was one of 1,684 passengers who were transported out of Hungary by the so-called Kastner train.

Teitelbaum, a major rabbinic leader in pre-Holocaust Hungary, stepped onto Swiss soil on December 6, 1944. Later on, when he immigrated to the United States and succeeded to build the largest Hasidic community in the world, his day of rescue became a holiday and a major annual feast among his followers, also commemorated by some other Hasidic groups of Austro-Hungarian origin.
