= Kastner train =

Holocaust rescue activity

- Kastner train passengers on their way to Switzerland
- Key people: Rudolf Kastner (1906–1957); Budapest Aid and Rescue Committee; Adolf Eichmann (1906–1962); Kurt Becher (1909–1995)
- Location: Budapest, Hungary
- Departure: Friday, 30 June 1944, c. 23:00 Central European Time.
- Diversion: Bergen-Belsen concentration camp near Hannover, 9 July, with 1,684 passengers on board.
- Arrival: 1,670 passengers arrived in Switzerland, August and December 1944

The Kastner train is the name usually given to a rescue operation which saved the lives of over 1,600 Jews from Hungary during World War II. It consisted of 35 cattle wagons that left Budapest on 30 June 1944, during the German occupation of Hungary, ultimately arriving safely in Switzerland after a large ransom was paid to the Nazis. The train was named after Rudolf Kastner, a Hungarian-Jewish lawyer and journalist, who was a founding member of the Budapest Aid and Rescue Committee, a group that smuggled Jews out of occupied Europe during the Holocaust. Kastner negotiated with Adolf Eichmann, the German SS officer in charge of deporting Hungary's Jews to Auschwitz in German-occupied Poland, to allow over 1,600 Jews to escape in exchange for gold, diamonds, and cash. The deal was controversial and has been the subject of much debate and criticism, with some accusing Kastner of collaborating with the Nazis, while others argue that he made difficult choices to save lives.

The train was organized during deportations to Auschwitz in May–July 1944 of 437,000 Hungarian Jews, three-quarters of whom were murdered in the gas chambers. Its passengers were chosen from a wide range of social classes, and included around 273 children, many of them orphaned. The wealthiest 150 passengers paid $1,500 (equivalent to $27,000 in 2025) each to cover their own and the others' escape. After a journey of several weeks, including a diversion to the Bergen-Belsen concentration camp in Germany, 1,670 surviving passengers reached Switzerland in August and December 1944.

Kastner emigrated to Mandatory Palestine in 1947. He was a spokesman for the Minister of Trade and Industry when his negotiations with Eichmann became the subject of controversy. Kastner had been told in April or May 1944 of the mass murder that was taking place inside Auschwitz. Allegations spread after the war that he had done nothing to warn the wider community, but had focused instead on trying to save a smaller number. The inclusion on the train of his family, as well as 388 people from the ghetto in his home town of Kolozsvár, reinforced the view of his critics that his actions had been self-serving.

The allegations culminated in Kastner being accused in a newsletter of having been a Nazi collaborator. The Israeli government sued for libel on his behalf, and the defendant's lawyer turned the trial into an indictment of the Mapai (Labour) leadership and its alleged failure to help Europe's Jews. The judge found against the government, ruling that Kastner had "sold his soul to the devil" by negotiating with Eichmann and selecting some Jews to be saved, while failing to alert others. Kastner was assassinated in Tel Aviv in March 1957. Nine months later, the Supreme Court of Israel overturned most of the lower court's ruling, stating in a 4–1 decision that the judge had "erred seriously".

== Organizer ==
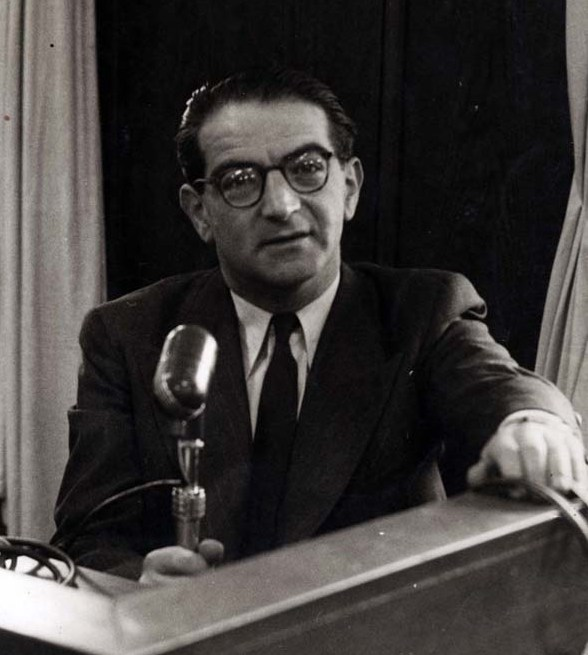
Rudolf Kastner

Rudolf Kastner (1906–1957), also known as Israel Rezső Kasztner, was born in Kolozsvár, Austria-Hungary. Kastner attended law school, then worked as a journalist for Új Kelet as a sports reporter and political commentator. He also became an assistant to Dr. József Fischer, a member of the Romanian parliament and leading member of the National Jewish Party, and in 1934, he married Fischer's daughter, Erzsébet.

Kastner gained a reputation as a political fixer, and joined the Ihud party, later known as Mapai, a left-wing Zionist party. He also helped to set up the Aid and Rescue Committee, along with Joel and Hansi Brand, Samuel Springmann, Ottó Komoly, a Budapest engineer, Ernő Szilágyi from the Hashomer Hatzair, and several others.

According to Joel Brand, the group helped 22,000–25,000 Jews in Nazi-occupied Europe reach the relative safety of Hungary between 1941 and March 1944, before the German invasion of that country on 19 March that year.

== Passengers ==
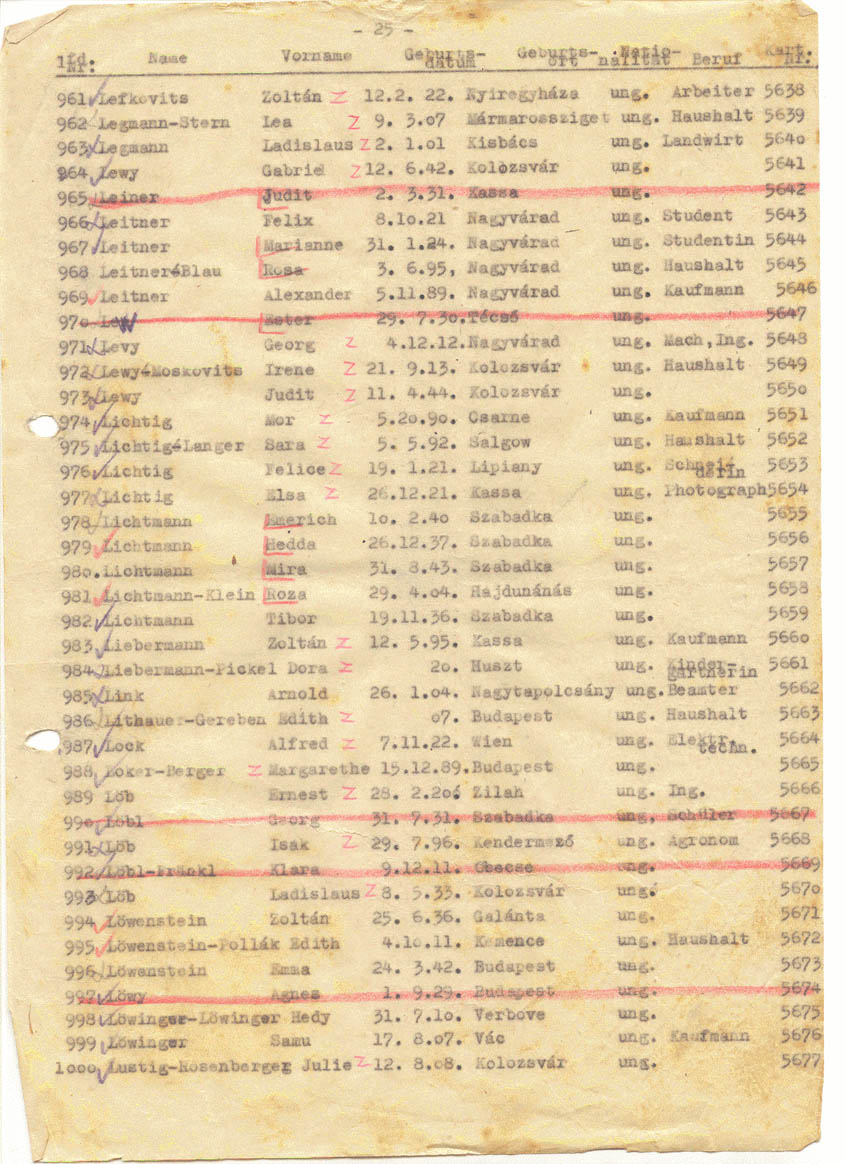
A page from the passenger list, showing the entry for Ladislaus Löb, 11 years old at the time, who became a professor of German at the University of Sussex

The passengers were chosen by a committee that included Kastner, Ottó Komoly, and Hansi Brand from the Aid and Rescue Committee, as well as Zsigmond Leb, a former president of the Orthodox community in Cluj. Israeli legal scholar Asher Maoz writes that Kastner told the Zionist Congress after the war, in a report he wrote about the actions of the Aid and Rescue Committee, that he saw the train as a "Noah's ark", because it contained a cross-section of the Jewish community, and in particular people who had worked in public service.

According to Jeno Kölb, a passenger who kept a diary, there were 972 female and 712 male passengers in all; the oldest was 82, the youngest was but a few days old. Ladislaus Löb, another passenger (see right), writes that the exact number on board when the train left Budapest remains uncertain, because in the early stages of the journey, several passengers disembarked, fearing that the train would end up in Auschwitz, while others took their places. Several women threw their young children on board at the last minute. What is known is that 1,684 passengers were registered when the train (unexpectedly) reached the Bergen-Belsen concentration camp near Hannover on 9 July.

According to Löb, the passengers included 199 Zionists from Transylvania and 230 from Budapest, and 126 Orthodox and ultra-Orthodox Jews, among them 40 rabbis; one of the rabbis was Joel Teitelbaum, the Satmar rebbe, along with his wife, Rebbetzin Faige Teitelbaum. Joel Teitelbaum, who was prominent in strictly Orthodox circles, was strongly opposed to modernization and to Zionism; nevertheless, his followers paid to have him included on the passenger list. Also among the passengers were scholars, artists, housewives, peasants, farmers, industrialists, bankers, journalists, teachers, and nurses. The writer Béla Zsolt was on board, as was the psychiatrist Léopold Szondi, the opera singer Dezső Ernster, the artist István Irsai, and Peter Munk, who became a businessman in Canada. There were also 388 people from Kastner's home town of Cluj, including family members. His mother, Helen Kastner, was given a place, as was his brother Ernő, his pregnant wife Bogyó (she gave birth to a daughter, Zsuzsi, in Switzerland in December 1944), along with her father József Fischer, and Bogyó's other relatives. Ernő Szilágyi of the Aid and Rescue Committee was on board, as were Joel Brand's mother, sister, and niece Margit, and the daughters of Ottó Komoly and Samu Stern, leading members of the Central Jewish Council (Judenrat).

Porter writes that each passenger was allowed to bring two changes of clothing, six sets of underwear, and food for 10 days. Three suitcases of cash, jewels, gold, and shares of stock, amounting to about $1,000 per person (equivalent to $18,000 in 2025), were paid to SS officer Kurt Becher in ransom.

== Journey ==
=== Linz, Austria ===
According to Bauer, the train was stopped at the Hungarian-Austrian border, where it could head west, or east to Auschwitz. The passengers started panicking; he alleges that Joel Teitelbaum and his party sent off messages asking people to save them, and only them.

Hershel Friedman, in his book "Mei'Afeiloo Loir Goodel" (Hebrew: מאפילה לאור גדול) about Teitelbaum, shows documentation that Teitelbaum tried, together with Chiem Roth, to save the whole train. Eichmann decided, for reasons that remain unclear, to divert the train to the Bergen-Belsen concentration camp in northwest Germany, near Hannover, though it has been claimed that this was the result of Eichmann increasing his demands which could not immediately be met, thus keeping his hostages "on ice".

The train passed through Linz, in Austria, where passengers disembarked and were sent to a military delousing station for medical inspections and showers. They were forced to strip and stand naked for hours waiting to see medical personnel or go into the showers; the women were subjected to intimate examinations by the doctors, supposedly in a search for lice. They also had their heads and pubic regions shaved.

Several passengers believed the showers would turn out to be gas chambers, something that Löb writes one of the SS guards confirmed with a grin.

Bauer cites this fear as evidence that the Hungarian-Jewish community was well aware of the information about the gas chambers inside Auschwitz. Between August 1943 and May 1944, Rudolf Vrba and three other Auschwitz escapees had passed information about the gas chambers to Jewish and other officials; it was this information that Vrba believed Kastner had access to, but did not distribute widely enough.

=== Bergen-Belsen, Germany ===
The concentration camps, including Bergen-Belsen in north Germany, where the passengers arrived on 9 July

When the train reached Bergen-Belsen on Sunday, 9 July, the passengers were taken to a special section, what would be known as the Ungarnlager (Hungarian camp), where they were held for weeks, and in some cases months. Löb writes that their daily diet consisted of 330 grams of a grey, dense bread, 15 grams of margarine, 25 grams of jam, 1 litre of vegetable (mostly turnip) soup, 1.5 litres of coffee substitute, and sometimes cheese or sausage, with milk and extra rations for children under 14. The group was allowed to organize itself and its activities. As they settled in, the men elected József Fischer to be president, and ran daily activities. With so many intellectuals among the passengers, there were regular poetry readings, and lectures in history, philosophy, and religious education. The living arrangements were primitive, with 130–160 people crammed into each room. Ladislaus Löb describes a typical night, based on a diary kept by Szidonia Devecseri, another passenger:

The rabbi's wife tries in vain to stop her children, aged four and eight, fighting in her bunk. Her neighbours, kept awake by the din, swear at them. A woman screams because a mouse has run over her face. Bedbugs drop from the higher bunks onto the lower. Another woman screams because the little boy in the bunk above her has spilled the jam jar he uses as a chamber pot all over her. Somebody has whooping cough. Another little boy begs his mother not to beat him because in his sleep he wet the bunk he shares with her. She does, and he squeals. A former night-club dancer tells dirty stories about her ex-colleagues to the refined Orthodox language teacher, who does not know whether to block her ears or to laugh. A spoilt rich wife has hung her clothes on all available nails, leaving no room for anybody else. The passage ends with: "In 24 out of 24 hours, there is never a minute's silence ..."

=== Switzerland ===
Arrival in Switzerland

The first batch of 318 passengers arrived in Switzerland on 18 August 1944, and the rest in December. It is reported that approximately 1,350 passengers arrived in Switzerland in December 1944. The passengers were ultimately released due to the efforts of Recha Sternbuch and also the JDC, a Jewish relief organization. There were several births and deaths, and about 17 continued to be detained in Bergen-Belsen on various pretexts. For example, some of the original passengers who had declared themselves Romanian upon arriving at Bergen-Belsen were forced to stay after King Michael overthrew the pro-Axis government of Ion Antonescu in Romania, aligning the nation with the Allies. The total saved was about 1,670. The group was housed in the Swiss village of Caux, near Montreux, in requisitioned former luxury hotels. The Orthodox Jews were housed in the Regina (formerly the Grand Hotel), and the others in the Hotel Esplanade (formerly Caux Palace).

== Kastner trial ==
The transport played a major role in the Kastner trial in Israel in 1954, in which the government of Israel sued Malchiel Gruenwald, a political pamphleteer, for libel, after he self-published a pamphlet charging Kastner, by then an Israeli government spokesman, with collaboration. A major detail of Gruenwald's allegations was that Kastner had agreed to the rescue in return for remaining silent about the fate of the mass of Hungarian Jews. This accusation was accepted by the court, leading Judge Benjamin Halevi to declare that Kastner had "sold his soul to the devil". Most of the ruling was overturned by the Supreme Court of Israel posthumously, in 1958. The Court upheld Judge Halevi's verdict on the manner in which Kastner offered testimony after the war on behalf of SS officer Kurt Becher.

Kastner was assassinated outside his home in Tel Aviv in March 1957 as a result of the decision and the subsequent publicity.

== See also ==
- Killing Kasztner (2008)
- Transport of concentration camp inmates to Tyrol, a Nazi attempt to move high-profile prisoners from Dachau concentration camp away from the advancing Western Allies, in April 1945
