= József Fischer =

Hungarian-Romanian lawyer and politician (1887–1952)

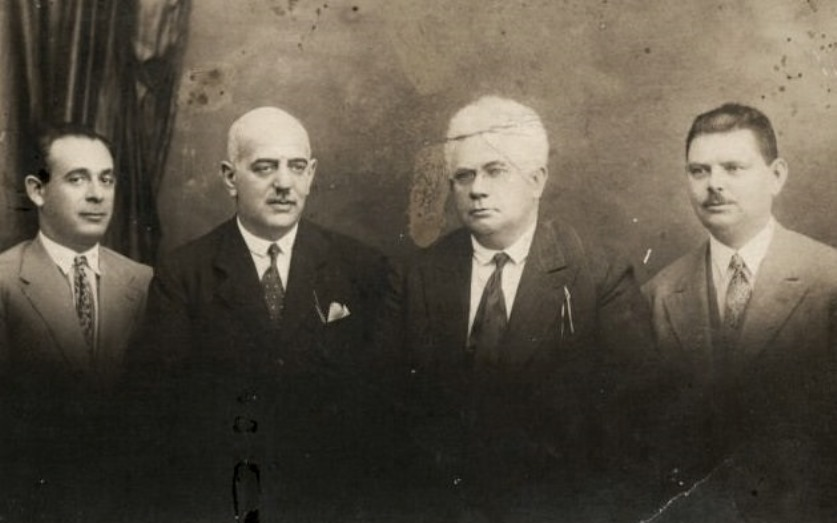
- The Jewish Parliamentary Club in 1928. From the left: Michel Landau, Tivadar Fischer, Mayer Ebner, József Fischer

Member of the Assembly of Deputies
- In office 1928–1933

Personal details
- Born: 15 December 1887 Tiszaújhely, Austria-Hungary (present-day Nove Selo, Ukraine)
- Died: 1952 (aged 64–65) Israel
- Party: Jewish Party
- Children: Erzsébet
- Profession: lawyer, politician

József Fischer (15 December 1887 – 1952) was a Hungarian and Romanian lawyer and politician of Jewish ethnicity. He was a prominent leader of the Jewish National Party in interwar Romania. In this capacity, he was a member of the Assembly of Deputies from 1928 to 1933. He served as head of the Judenrat in Kolozsvár Ghetto during the Holocaust.

== Early life ==
József Fischer was born into a wealthy Orthodox Jewish family in Tiszaújhely, Austria-Hungary (present-day Nove Selo, Ukraine) on 15 December 1887. According to one account, one of his brothers was Tivadar Fischer, co-founder of the Jewish Party. Allegedly they were sons of a rabbi from Alba Iulia, stranded in Romania upon the end of World War I. Historian Attila Gidó writes that they were unrelated by blood, but united by their common defense of Orthodox Judaism; initially, József Fischer had been a critic of Zionism, before being drawn into it by other Transylvanian activists, to become "one of Transylvanian Zionism's most important personalities".

After taking his bar exam, he worked as a lawyer clerk at the law firm of Vilmos Vázsonyi in Budapest. Fischer moved to Kolozsvár, Transylvania (Cluj; present-day Cluj-Napoca, Romania) in 1913. Following the end of World War I and dissolution of Austria-Hungary in 1918–1920, Fischer remained in Transylvania, which became part of the Kingdom of Romania. He functioned as editor-in-chief of Új Kelet, a Hungarian-language Zionist Jewish periodical in Cluj, from 1919 to 1921. He was elected president of the Neolog Jew congregation of Cluj in 1919. He held this position until 1944.

== Political career ==
Fischer was a founding member of the Transylvanian Jewish National League (EZNSz/UNET), serving its president from 1923 to 1930. In this capacity, he was a close associate of Tivadar Fischer and Adolphe Stern. They founded their organization because they had expressed their opposition to the Union of Native Jews (UER) as early as 1923, calling for its transformation into a "general union" of loosely affiliated bodies. Against the position taken by pro-UER Transylvanians such as Miksa Klein, they advised in favor of communitarianism, rejecting assimilation into the Romanian mainstream. As noted by political scientist Randolph L. Braham, "political culture" in the Fischers' constituency "was forged by their earlier experiences in the Hungarian Kingdom."

The EZNSz/UNET formed a cartel with the National Peasants' Party (PNȚ) right before the 1928 Romanian general election, which won both Tivadar Fischer and József Fischer seats in the Assembly of Deputies. They coalesced into a "parliamentary club" with Mayer Ebner and the Bessarabian Zionist Michel Landau, calling themselves segments of a "country-wide Jewish party". The Jewish Party (PER), a "unified party of Romanian Zionists" was established on 4 May 1931 in Bucharest. Its first conference elected Tivadar Fischer as party president, while József Fischer became leader of the party's Transylvanian branch. The Jewish Party took part in the 1931 Romanian general election and won four seats in the Assembly of Deputies. József Fischer gained a mandate in Maramureș County. During the 1932 Romanian general election campaign, in February, Landau, alongside Tivadar and József Fischer, were unexpectedly barred by the government authorities from speaking at an electoral meeting in Sighet; their attempt to address the Maramureș Jews from inside Talmud Tora Synagogue was also broken up by the Romanian Police. Nevertheless, the Jewish Party took 2.26% and 5 seats, József Fischer was also re-elected. The party lost all parliamentary seats during the 1933 Romanian general election.

== The Holocaust ==
Northern Transylvania, including Cluj, was ceded by Romania to Hungary in the Second Vienna Award in September 1940. Both Tivadar Fischer and József Fischer remained on Hungarian territory, while their party was banned. Following the German invasion of Hungary in March 1944, his fellow Zionists offered József Fischer to escape to Romania, but he refused. He attended that meeting of rabbis and congregation leaders in Budapest in March 1944, where the Nazi authorities decided to establish the Jewish Council of Budapest. The Schutzstaffel established the Kolozsvár Ghetto, where József Fischer became president of the Judenrat.

Fischer was responsible for organizing life and order within the walls of the ghetto. According to witnesses, he was repeatedly beaten and abused during his operation by local Gestapo men and the Hungarian police. Together with his son-in-law Rezső Kasztner (or Rudolf Kastner), he took part in the organization of the Kastner train mission. He was among the 300 Jews for whom Kastner obtained a reprieve from extermination at Auschwitz. They were instead transported by the Nazis to Bergen-Belsen (where he temporarily chaired a "committee" of exempted Jews), and subsequently allowed to leave for Switzerland in late June 1944. His mother and two brothers, however, were killed in Auschwitz. Fischer emigrated to Mandatory Palestine (aliyah) in the autumn of 1945. He died in 1952.

== Sources ==
- Braham, Randolph L., Genocide and Retribution. Boston etc.: Kluwer Academic Publishers, 1983. ISBN 978-94-009-6689-5
- Gidó, Attila: "Cadrele instituționale ale reprezentării intereselor politice evreiești din Transilvania interbelică (Uniunea Națională a evreilor din Transilvania și Partidul Evreiesc)", in Vasile Ciobanu, Sorin Radu (eds.), Partide politice și minorități naționale din România în secolul XX, Vol. IV, pp. 79–98. Sibiu: TechnoMedia, 2009. ISBN 978-606-8030-53-1
- Gidó, Attila: Două decenii. Evreii din Cluj în perioada interbelică. Cluj-Napoca: Editura Institutului pentru Studierea Problemelor Minorităților Naționale, 2014. ISBN 978-606-8377-28-5
- Veszprémy, László Bernát (2021). "Kik vezették a vidéki zsidó tanácsokat? [Who led the rural Jewish councils?]". Múlt és Jövő (Új folyam) (in Hungarian). 32 (1): 101–117. ISSN 0864-8646.
- Veszprémy, László Bernát (2023). Tanácstalanság. A zsidó vezetés Magyarországon és a holokauszt, 1944–1945 [Bereft of Council. Jewish leadership in Hungary during the Holocaust in 1944–1945] (in Hungarian). Budapest: Jaffa Kiadó. ISBN 978-963-475-731-3.
