= Iton Meyuhad =

Israeli weekly magazine

Iton Meyuhad (Hebrew: עיתון מיוחד, lit. Special newspaper) was a weekly magazine published in Israel in 1933-1952.

== History ==
Iton Meyuhad was published and edited by Alexander Sauber. It mainly dealt with business and crime, and was considered the first newspaper in Israel that dealt with unsubstantiated rumors and gossip. It is also known for being the first newspaper in Israel that use color.

Most of the newspaper was written by Sauber himself, under different names. The titles were often strange and sensationalist. Other writers for the paper included Yitzhak Sadeh (as Y. Noded), Malchiel Gruenwald and David Almog.

In 1952, Sauber was invited to write for Yedioth Ahronoth, took the job, and stopped publishing Iton Meyuhad.
