= Irsay =

Irsay is a surname of Hungarian origin. Notable people with the surname include:

- Carlie Irsay-Gordon (born circa 1981), American sports owner, daughter of Jim
- Jim Irsay (1959–2025), American businessman and football executive, son of Robert
- Robert Irsay (1923–1997), American businessman and professional football team owner

== See also ==
- The Jim Irsay Collection, a collection of musical instruments, American history artifacts, and popular culture items
- Irsai Olivér, a Hungarian white wine variety, also known under the synonym Oliver Irsay
- István Irsai (1896–1968), Hungarian-born Israeli architect and graphic designer
