= Benjamin Halevy =

Israeli judge and politician (1910–1996)

- בנימין הלוי
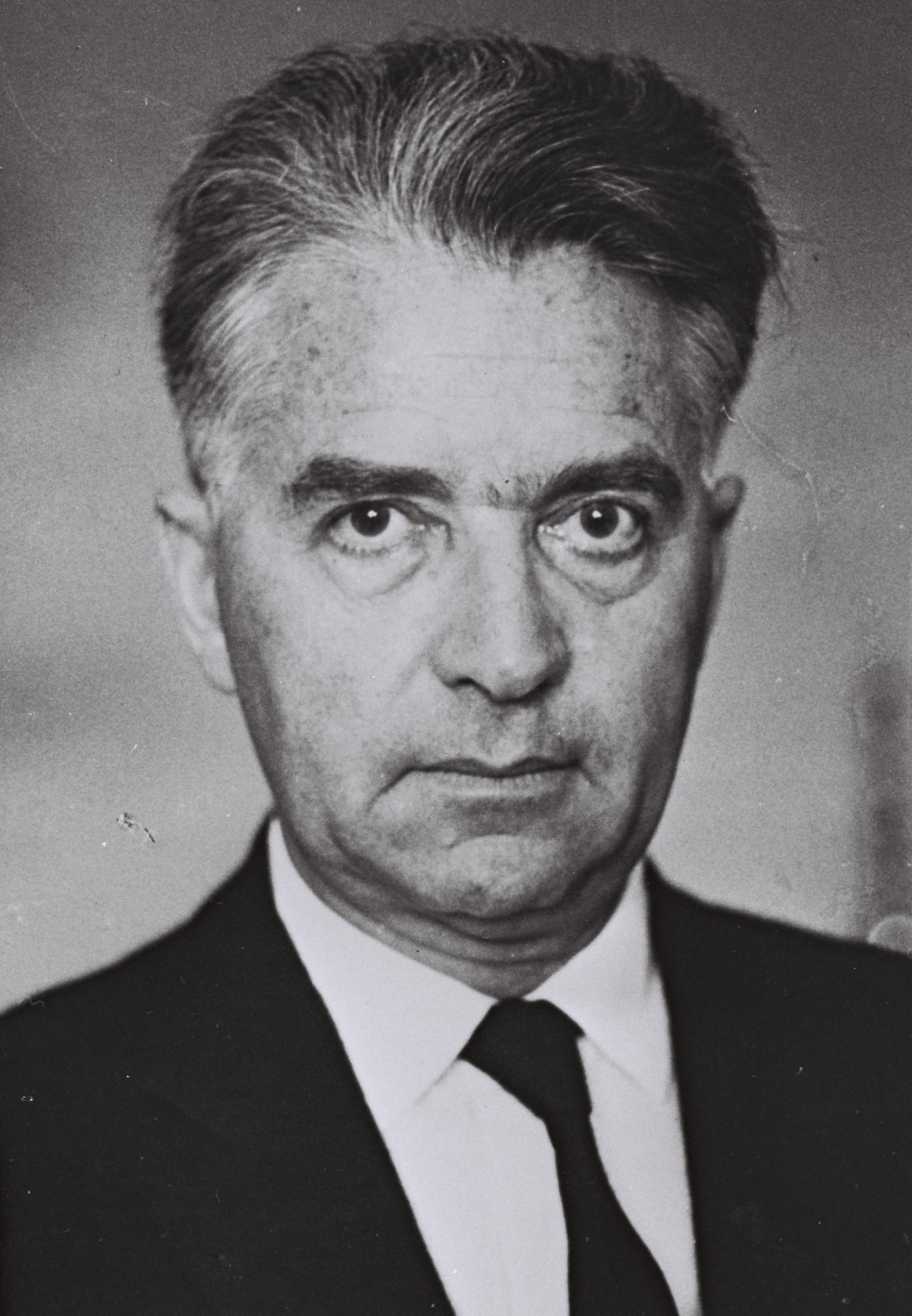
- Halevy in 1969

Faction represented in the Knesset
- 1969–1974: Gahal
- 1974–1975: Likud
- 1975–1977: Independent
- 1977–1978: Democratic Movement for Change
- 1978–1981: Democratic Movement
- 1981: Independent

Personal details
- Born: 6 May 1910 Weissenfels, Province of Saxony, Kingdom of Prussia, German Empire
- Died: 7 August 1996 (aged 86)

Benjamin Halevy (Hebrew: בנימין הלוי; 6 May 1910 – 7 August 1996) was an Israeli judge and politician.

== Biography ==
Halevy was born Ernst Levi in Weissenfels, Germany and educated at the Universities of Freiburg, Göttingen and Berlin. He immigrated to what was then British Mandatory Palestine in 1933 after Adolf Hitler became Chancellor of Germany, and studied at the Hebrew University of Jerusalem.

Halevy was a Magistrate Judge in Jerusalem during the Mandate period, from 1938 until Israel's declaration of independence in 1948. He served as a District Judge and the President of the Jerusalem District Court until 1963 when he was appointed to the Supreme Court of Israel.

Halevy was the sole judge in what became known as the "Kastner trial," a libel lawsuit against Malchiel Gruenwald, a hotelier, who accused Rudolf Kastner of having been a Nazi collaborator. Halevy allowed the scope of the trial to be expanded and ruled that Kastner had indeed, in his words, "sold his soul to the devil." Kastner was later assassinated and Halevy's ruling was mostly overturned by the Supreme Court. The manner in which he conducted the trial was criticized.

Halevy was the sole judge at the trial of the Kafr Qasim massacre's perpetrators, and in his decision famously wrote, "The distinguishing mark of a manifestly illegal order is that above such an order should fly, like a black flag, a warning saying: 'Prohibited!'" He was later a judge at the trial of Adolf Eichmann, along with Yitzhak Raveh and Moshe Landau.

In 1969 Halevy resigned from the court in order to enter politics. He was elected to the Seventh Knesset for the Gahal (Herut-Liberal Bloc) list, and again to the Eighth Knesset in 1973 after Gahal had merged into Likud. He later left the party to sit as an independent MK. In the 1977 elections, he was returned to the Knesset on Dash's list, but the party split up after a year, and Halevy joined the Democratic Movement, before leaving to again sit as an independent. During the Ninth Knesset he also served as deputy speaker.

Today a street in his birthplace Weissenfels is named after him.

He was married for many years to Luba. They had a son and daughter. After Luba's death he married Michal Halevy.

== See also ==
- Israeli judicial system
- Adolf Eichmann
