= Dezső Ernster =

Hungarian opera singer (1898–1981)

Dezső Ernster (23 November 1898 – 15 February 1981) was a Hungarian opera singer who sang leading bass roles with the New York Metropolitan Opera from 1946 to 1963. In 1929, he created the role of Baron d'Houdoux in Hindemith's Neues vom Tage.

== Biography ==
Dezső Ernster was born in Pécs, the son of a cantor, and studied in Budapest and Vienna. He made his debut in Plauen in eastern Germany, as Hermann in Tannhäuser in the 1924–1925 season. From 1929 he appeared at the Berlin State Opera and the Kroll Opera House, where in 1929 he sang in the world premiere of Paul Hindemith's Neues vom Tage conducted by Otto Klemperer. In 1931 he was engaged by Arturo Toscanini to sing in Bayreuth and appeared there as Ritter in Parsifal, Reinmar in Tannhäuser and Steuermann in Tristan und Isolde.

With the Nazi rise to power in 1933, Ernster left Germany to live in Austria. In 1938 he went on tour in the United States with the Salzburg Opera Guild and stayed there for two years before returning to Hungary. By that time Jewish singers could no longer perform in Hungarian theatres. However, through OMIKE, the Hungarian Jewish Educational Association, he was able to sing the Jewish community's Goldmark Hall. In 1944, he escaped on the Kastner train, which carried 1,684 Jews to safety in Switzerland.

After World War II ended, Ernster appeared in Basel and at New York's Metropolitan Opera where he made his debut on 20 November 1946 as King Marke in Tristan und Isolde. He went on to sing 175 performances with company between 1946 and 1963. His last performance at the Met was the Grand Inquisitor in Don Carlo During his career Ernster also sang with the San Francisco Opera, the Vienna State Opera and the Royal Opera House, Covent Garden. He returned to Europe in 1963 and settled in Switzerland. His last opera performance was in Budapest in 1966 when he sang Sarastro in Die Zauberflöte at the Margaret Island open-air theatre.

Dezső Ernster spent his last years in Zurich where he died of cancer in 1981, aged 82. His sister, Adelina Ernster (died 1963, New York), was also an opera singer and performed primarily in Frankfurt and Hamburg.

== Principal roles ==
- Sarastro (Die Zauberflöte)
- Commendatore (Don Giovanni)
- Daland (Der fliegende Holländer)
- Hermann (Tannhäuser
- Hunding (Die Walküre)
- Hagen (Götterdämmerung)
- King Marke (Tristan und Isolde)

== Recordings ==
- Don Giovanni – Salzburg Festival (1954), conducted by Wilhelm Furtwängler. Label: Deutsche Grammophon
- Fidelio – Metropolitan Opera (1951), conducted by Bruno Walter. Label: Music and Arts Programs of America
- Götterdämmerung – compilation from performances at the Metropolitan Opera (1936, 1939) conducted by Artur Bodanzky and (1951) conducted by Fritz Stiedry; Royal Opera House, Covent Garden (1937) conducted by Wilhelm Furtwängler; La Scala (1950) conducted by Wilhelm Furtwängler. Label: Guild
- Salome – Metropolitan Opera (1949) conducted by Fritz Reiner. Label: Guild

== Sources ==
- Casaglia, Gherardo (2005). "Neues vom Tage, 8 June 1929". L'Almanacco di Gherardo Casaglia (in Italian).
- Frojimovics, Kinga and Komoróczy, Géza, Jewish Budapest: Monuments, Rites, History, Central European University Press, 1999. ISBN 963-9116-37-8
- Löb, Ladislaus, Dealing with Satan: Rezső Kasztner's Daring Rescue Mission, Jonathan Cape, 2008. ISBN 978-0-224-07792-7
- Maguidhir, Ivan, Dezső Ernster, 2008. Accessed 25 December 2009.
- Metropolitan Opera, Ernster, Dezsö (Bass), performance record on the MetOpera Database
- The New York Times, "Adelina Ernster", 18 November 1963, p. 33
- The New York Times, "Deszo Ernster, 82, Bass; Sang With Met 17 Years", 26 February 1981, p. B16.
- Rosenthal, H. and Warrack, J. "Ernster, Dezső", The Concise Oxford Dictionary of Opera, 2nd Edition, Oxford University Press, 1979, pp. 155–156. ISBN 0-19-311318-X

Further reading

- Imre, Fábián, Ernster Dezső, Zeneműkiadó, 1969 (in Hungarian with an introduction by Otto Klemperer)
- Di Cave, Luciano, Mille voci una stella: il contributo degli esecutori vocali ebrei o di origine ebraica alla musica operistica e classica, Carucci Editore, 1985 (in Italian)
