= Ladislaus Löb =

Germany literature scholar (1933–2021)

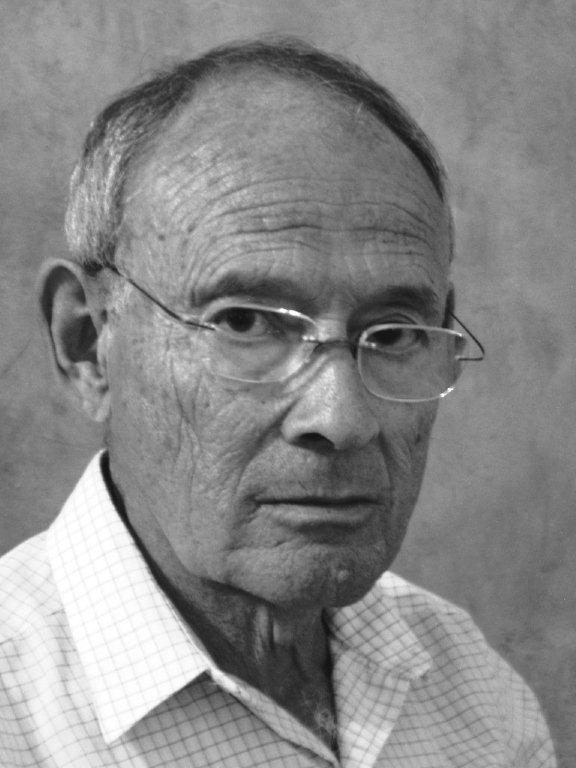
- Löb in 2003
- Born: 8 May 1933; Cluj, Kingdom of Romania (today Cluj-Napoca, Romania)
- Died: 2 October 2021 (aged 88); Zürich, Switzerland
- Education: English and German, University of Zürich, 1953–1961
- Occupations: Professor Emeritus of German, University of Sussex

Ladislaus Löb (8 May 1933 – 2 October 2021) was a writer, translator, Holocaust survivor, scholar of the literature and drama of the German Enlightenment and professor emeritus of German at the University of Sussex in England. He was the author of From Lessing to Hauptmann: Studies in German Drama (1974); a monograph, in German, on the nineteenth-century dramatist Christian Dietrich Grabbe (1996); and Dealing with Satan: Rezső Kasztner's Daring Rescue Mission (2008), in which he recounts his experiences an 11-year-old boy sent to Bergen-Belsen concentration camp and freed as the result of a controversial deal that Rezső Kasztner (aka Rudolf Kastner) brokered with Adolf Eichmann.

== Early life ==
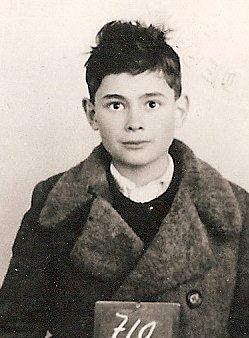
Age eleven, on his arrival in Switzerland, December 1944

Löb was born in Cluj (Hungarian: Kolozsvár), northern Transylvania, Kingdom of Romania, the only child of Izsó, a businessman, and Jolán (née Rosenberg), who died of tuberculosis in 1942. He was raised in Marghita, a small town of 8,600 residents, 150 km northwest of the city.

=== Kasztner train ===
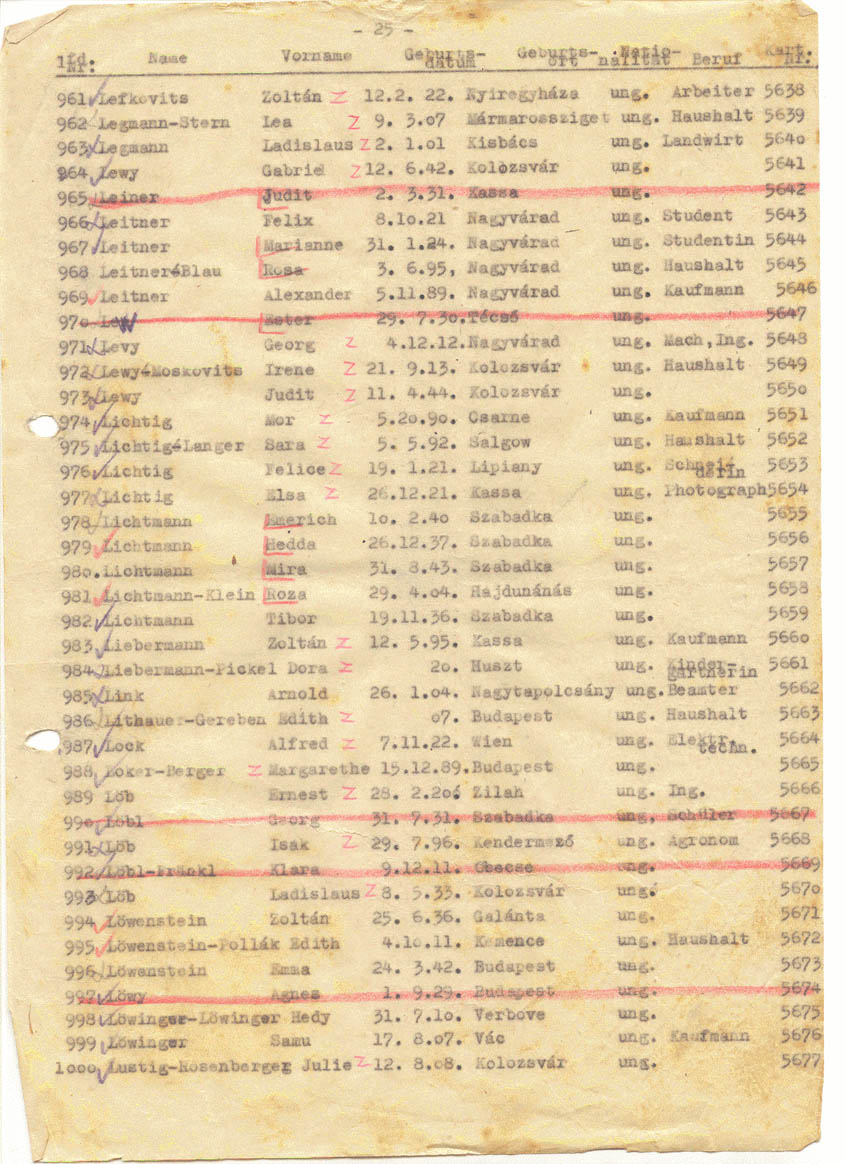
Page from the Kastner train passenger list, showing the entry for Ladislaus Löb

In 1944 Löb was taken with his relatives to the Kolozsvár Ghetto (the time Northern Transylvania was part of Hungary), but he escaped with his father and joined the “Kasztner group” in Budapest.

The group consisted of around 1,600 Jews who were given safe passage out of Hungary to Switzerland, as a result of a deal between Adolf Eichmann and the Hungarian lawyer and Zionist leader Rezső Kasztner. The group was detained in the Bergen-Belsen concentration camp near Hannover, Germany, before Eichmann allowed them to leave for Switzerland in two batches, in August and December 1944. In the 1950s in Israel, Kaszner was accused of collaboration and murdered by Jewish extremists.

== Education and career ==
In Switzerland Löb spent two years at the Ecole d’Humanité, before attending the Realgymnasium of Zürich from 1948 and studying English and German at the University of Zürich from 1953 to 1961.

In 1963 he took up a post at the University of Sussex in Brighton. He taught German language, German literature and Comparative literature, and held visiting professorships in the University of Constance and Middlebury College. Before retiring as an emeritus Professor in 1998 he published mainly studies in literature; since his retirement he has concentrated on translating from German or Hungarian. His combined account of his own experience of the Holocaust and the fate of Kasztner has been published in six languages.

Löb was a naturalized citizen of both Britain and Switzerland, and in 2017, he returned, with his wife Sheila, to live in Zürich. There he completed the first English translation of Kurt Guggenheim's Alles in Allem, which he described as “a vast panoramic novel set in Zürich from 1900 to 1950” that traces the transformation of “a rural community into a dynamic modern city”.

Ladislaus Löb died in Zürich on 2 October 2021 at the age of 88 from complications following a fall.

== Works ==
=== Books ===
- Mensch und Gesellschaft bei J.B. Priestley (Doctoral thesis, Bern 1962)
- From Lessing to Hauptmann: Studies in German Drama (London 1974)
- Christian Dietrich Grabbe (Stuttgart 1996)
- Dealing with Satan: Rezso Kasztner's Daring Rescue Mission (Jonathan Cape, 2008).

- Also published as Rezso Kasztner. The Daring Rescue of Hungarian Jews: A Survivor's Account (Random House/Pimlico, 2009).

=== Translations ===
- Krisztián Ungváry: Battle for Budapest 1944-1945 (London 2002)
- Otto Weininger: Sex and Character (Bloomington 2003)
- Béla Zsolt: Nine Suitcases (London 2005)
- Friedrich Nietzsche: Writings from the Early Notebooks (Cambridge 2009)
