= Yoel Zussman =

Former President of the Supreme Court of Israel

- יואל זוסמן
- Zussman in 1976

Supreme Court of Israel judge
- In office 1951–1980

President of the Supreme Court of Israel
- In office 1976–1980
- Preceded by: Shimon Agranat
- Succeeded by: Moshe Landau

Personal details
- Born: 24 October 1910 Kraków, Austria-Hungary
- Died: 2 March 1982 (aged 71)

Yoel Zussman also spelled Yoel Sussman (Hebrew: יואל זוסמן; 24 October 1910 – 2 March 1982) was an Israeli jurist and the fourth President of the Supreme Court of Israel, from 1976 to 1980.

== Biography ==
Sussman was born in 1910 in Kraków, Austria-Hungary (now in Poland). He received his LLB from the University of London and his PhD from Heidelberg University. He immigrated to the British Mandate of Palestine in 1934. He was certified as a lawyer and served as Chief Prosecutor of the Israel Defense Forces. In 1951 he was appointed to the Supreme Court and served as its Deputy President for several periods of time until 1953.

In 1965 during the Supreme Court hearings on election appeal case Ya'akov Yardor vs Central Election Committee for the Sixth Knesset, popularly known as El-Ard Petition, Sussman coined definition of Israel as a "self-defending democracy", which was adopted by the Court. Supreme Court upheld ban on El-Ard (English: The Land), a radical Arab electoral list, from participation in the Sixth Knesset elections and Sussman, taking the Supreme Court of West Germany ruling as a precedent, stated that there are supraconstitutional considerations hailing from natural law, that may be superior to any legislation:

Just as an Individual is not bound to agree to being killed, neither is a state is obliged to consent to being annihilated and erased from the map... The German Constitutional Court...spoke of a "fighting democracy", which does not open its doors to acts of sabotage in the guise of legitimate parliamentary activity. For myself, as far as Israel is concerned, I am prepared to confine myself to "self-defending democracy," and tools for defending the existence of the state are at hand, even if we have not found them set forth in detail in the Elections Law

In 1976 he succeeded Shimon Agranat as President of the Supreme Court. He retired in 1980 and was succeeded by Moshe Landau. He was an author of several books on bill laws and arbitration laws. He died in 1982.

== Awards and honours ==
- In 1975, Sussman was awarded the Israel Prize, in jurisprudence.
- In 1984 the Institute of Advanced Judicial Studies was established in his memory.

== See also ==
- List of Israel Prize recipients
