= Nine Suitcases (play) =

Nine Suitcases is a one-man stage play adapted for theatre and performed by British actor David Prince from the Holocaust memoirs of Béla Zsolt as translated from Hungarian into English by Ladislaus Lob. Music was composed and performed by Bethan Morgan. It was directed by Lynn Hunter.
