= Eva Heyman =

Jewish-Hungarian Holocaust victim

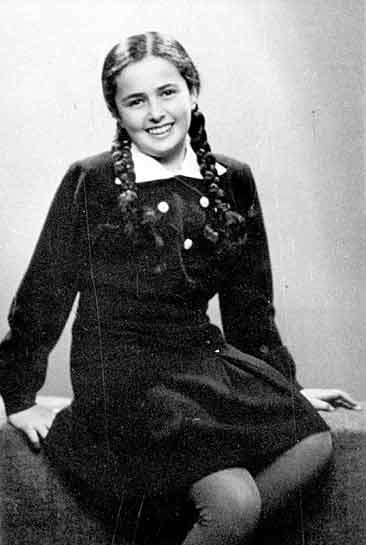
- Born: 13 February 1931; Oradea, Kingdom of Romania
- Died: 17 October 1944 (aged 13); Auschwitz-Birkenau, German Reich
- Occupations: Writer; author

Eva Heyman (Hungarian: Heyman Éva; 13 February 1931 – 17 October 1944) was a Jewish girl from Oradea. She began keeping a diary in 1944 during the German occupation of Hungary. Published under the name The Diary of Eva Heyman, her diary has been compared to The Diary of a Young Girl by Anne Frank. She discusses the extreme deterioration of the circumstances the Jewish community faced in the city, offering a detailed account of the increasingly restrictive anti-Jewish laws, the psychological anguish and despair, the loss of their rights and liberties and the confiscation of property they endured. Heyman was 13 years old when she and her grandparents were murdered in the Holocaust.

In May 2019, the Eva Stories project was launched, visually depicting extracts from her diary on Instagram. On International Holocaust Day 2020 (27 January), Eva Stories was also launched on Snapchat.

== Biography ==
Heyman started writing her diary on her thirteenth birthday 13 February 1944 (the same year Germany occupied Hungary). The town in which she was born has been called Nagyvárad by Hungarians and Oradea by Romanians. In 1931, the year she was born, it was part of Romania; in her diary, Heyman calls it "Varad", short for Nagyvárad, a colloquial name widely used. The city was part of Hungary at that time.

She was raised in an assimilated Hungarian-Jewish family. Her father, Béla Heyman, was an architect from a prominent family. The family owned a hotel which Heyman wrote was "full of Persian rugs". Her parents divorced when she was a young child. Her mother married socialist writer Béla Zsolt. Her grandfather was a pharmacist, who had supported the Kingdom of Hungary against Romania. Heyman recalls watching the arrival of Miklós Horthy from the window of her grandfather's pharmacy.

Her mother Ágnes "Ági" Zsolt was also a pharmacist. Her daughter described her as "more beautiful than Greta Garbo". Ági and Zsolt were living in Paris when the Germans invaded Poland. Terrified for her daughter, she convinced her husband to return to Budapest. She was held at the Bergen-Belsen concentration camp, but made it to safety in Switzerland after she was rescued from the camp. Her mother committed suicide after her daughter's diary was published. The location of the original manuscript is not known.

Being raised in a political family, Heyman and her grandparents would have been expecting rough treatment as the Nazis approached Nagyvárad in 1944. Heyman was morbidly preoccupied with her own death at the hands of the Nazis, which she grew to believe was inevitable after her best friend was killed by Nazis. Her diary begins as air raids sirens herald the approach of the Nazis in Nagyvárad. Together with her grandparents, Heyman was murdered in Auschwitz in October 1944.

== Diary and publication ==
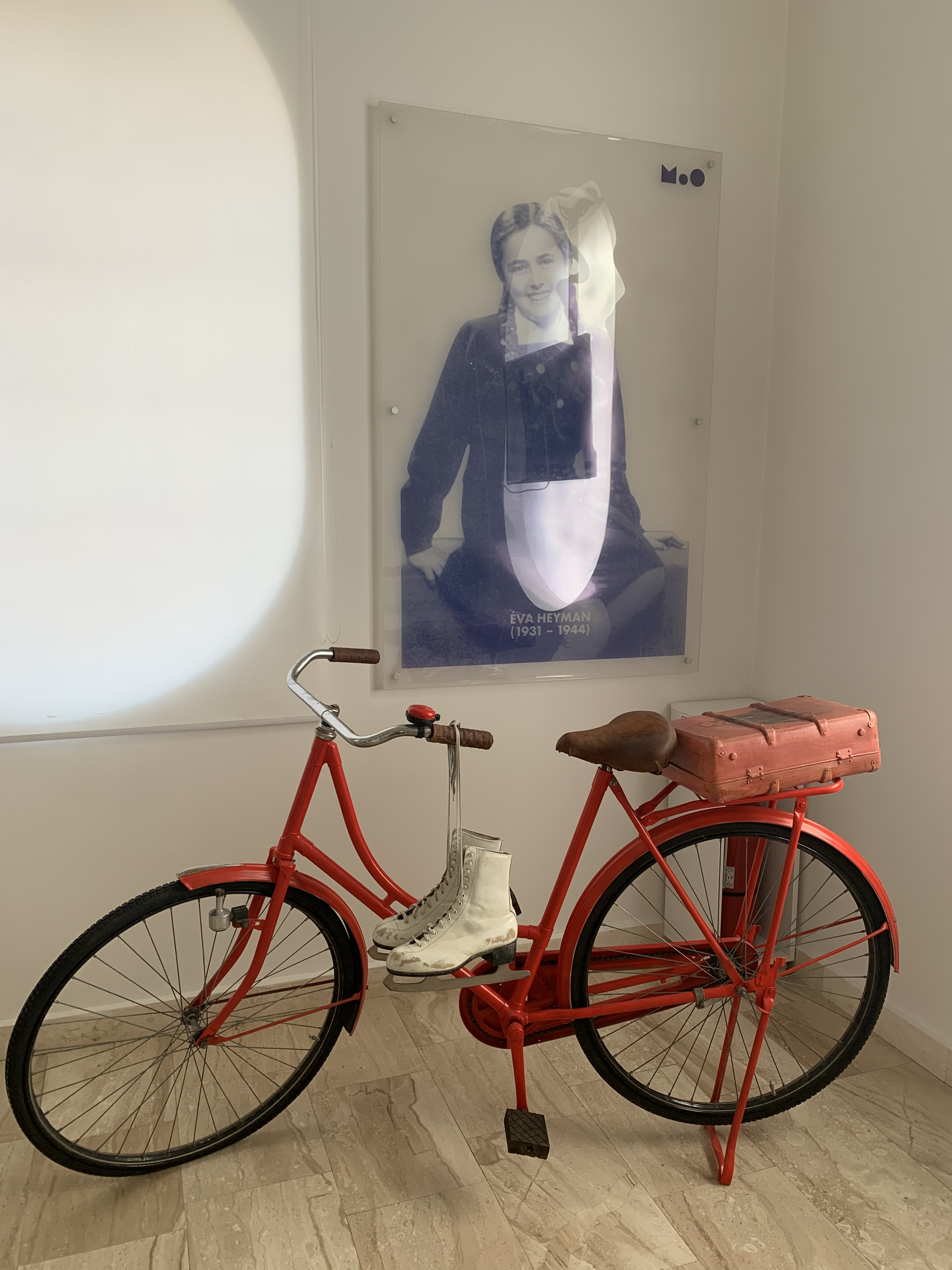
A corner dedicated to Heyman in the Museum of Jewish History in Oradea

Heyman's diary was published first in Hungarian. It was first translated into Hebrew by Yad Vashem in 1964, then into English by Moshe M. Kohn. The English edition was published by Yad Vashem in 1974. The diary has been compared to The Diary of Anne Frank.

In her diary she talks about her 13th birthday party, the last before she is murdered at Auschwitz. She writes of a pleasant party with tea, sandwiches, and a type of chocolate cake called Sachertorte. She is given a navy blue knit dress, a light tan spring coat and for the first time two pairs of sheer stockings. She also received an assortment of books, music-disc recordings, candies, and oranges.

She writes of her mother burning books written by Béla Zsolt, who she calls "Uncle Bela", and the destruction of works by other authors who were deemed dangerous like Ferenc Molnár. She admits to having read Molnár's novel The Paul Street Boys.

== Commemoration and representation in culture ==
- In 2012, a research center for Jewish history was opened at the University of Oradea (Nagyvárad) that was named after Eva Heyman.
- In 2015, in the city of Oradea (Nagyvarad), a statue of Eva Heyman was placed in memory of the children of the city who were murdered in the Holocaust. It is situated in Bălcescu Park, from where over 20,000 Jews were deported by trains to Auschwitz between 24 May and 3 June 1944. This statue was the result of 3 years of hard pro bono work by the non-profit organisation Tikvah and the generosity of donors from around the world. The sculptor was Flor Kent. In 2018, the statue was gifted by Asociatia Tikvah to the City of Oradea.
- In 2017, a theater show entitled Eva Heyman: Anne Frank of Transylvania was staged in Romania based on Eva's story.
- In 2021, Teatrul Regina Maria in Oradea staged a theatre show based on Eva's story; the dramatization, concept and direction was done by the actor Emil Sauciuc and Ioana-Maria Repciuc, the actress who also plays Eva's role in the show.

=== Eva Stories ===
In May 2019, a series of short videos that illustrate her story was uploaded to Instagram in the style that characterizes the media, under the title Eva Stories. The videos went viral and attracted worldwide interest. During the 2020 World Holocaust Forum in Jerusalem, world leaders planned to post Eva-related online messages in order to popularize the project and help combat anti-Semitism. On International Holocaust Day, 27 January 2020, Eva Stories was also launched on Snapchat.

== See also ==
- List of Holocaust diarists
- List of diarists
- List of posthumous publications of Holocaust victims
