= Shimon Agranat =

Former President of the Supreme Court of Israel

- שמעון אגרנט
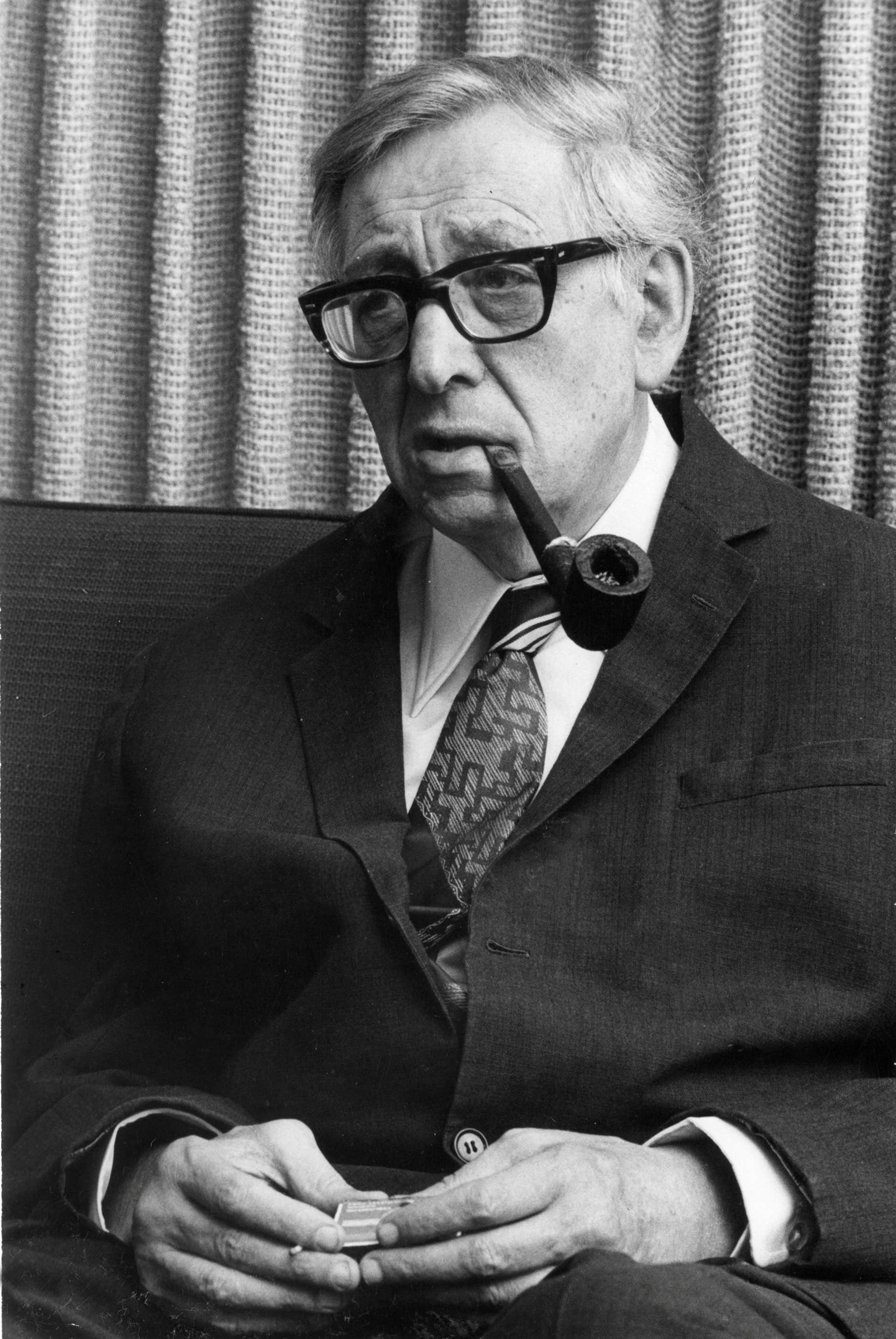
- Agranat in 1976

President of the Supreme Court of Israel
- In office 1965–1976
- Preceded by: Yitzhak Olshan
- Succeeded by: Yoel Zussman

Personal details
- Born: September 5, 1906 Louisville, Kentucky, United States
- Died: August 10, 1992 (aged 85) Jerusalem, Israel
- Education: University of Chicago
- Awards: Israel Prize
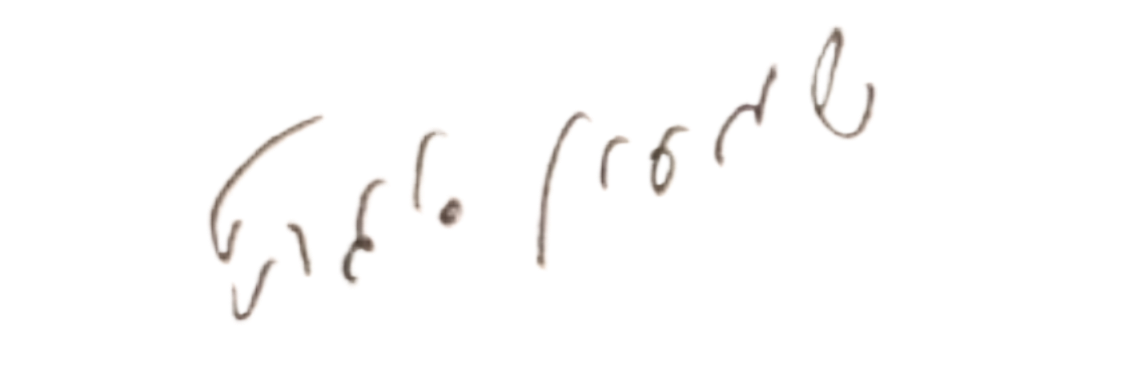
- Signature

Shimon Agranat (Hebrew: שמעון אגרנט; September 5, 1906 – August 10, 1992) was an Israeli jurist and the third President of the Supreme Court of Israel, from 1965 until 1976.

== Biography ==
Agranat was born to a Jewish-Zionist family in Louisville, Kentucky in 1906. His parents, Aaron Joseph Agranat and Polya Schnitzer, had immigrated to the United States from Russia shortly before his birth. Agranat grew up in Chicago and attended Jewish schools. He studied law and philosophy at the University of Chicago, and graduated with a J.D. degree from the University of Chicago Law School in 1929. He emigrated to Mandatory Palestine in 1930 and settled in Haifa.

Agranat spoke Hebrew, with a strong American accent.

Agranat was married to Carmel Friedlander, the daughter of Israel Friedlander and niece of Norman Bentwich. The couple lived in Nayot, Jerusalem, and had five children.

Agranat died in Jerusalem on August 10, 1992.

== Judicial career ==
In April 1932, Agranat was certified as a lawyer in Palestine. After completing an internship in Jerusalem, he worked as a private lawyer. In 1940, he was appointed a judge on the Haifa Magistrate's Court. In 1948, he became President of the Haifa District Court.

In December 1948, Agranat was appointed to the Israeli Supreme Court at age 42, becoming one of the world's youngest Supreme Court justices. He presided over the Court in the Kastner trial in 1958. From 1954 to 1966, while continuing to serve on the Supreme Court, he was a visiting professor of Criminal Law at the Hebrew University of Jerusalem. He was appointed President of the Supreme Court in 1965, and served in this position until 1976, retiring at the age of 70.

In 1974, he headed the Agranat Commission, which investigated the 1973 Yom Kippur War. The findings of this commission led to the resignation of Prime Minister Golda Meir, Defense Minister Moshe Dayan, and IDF Chief of Staff David Elazar.

Following his retirement, he taught at the Hebrew University of Jerusalem and Tel Aviv University.

== Awards and commemoration ==
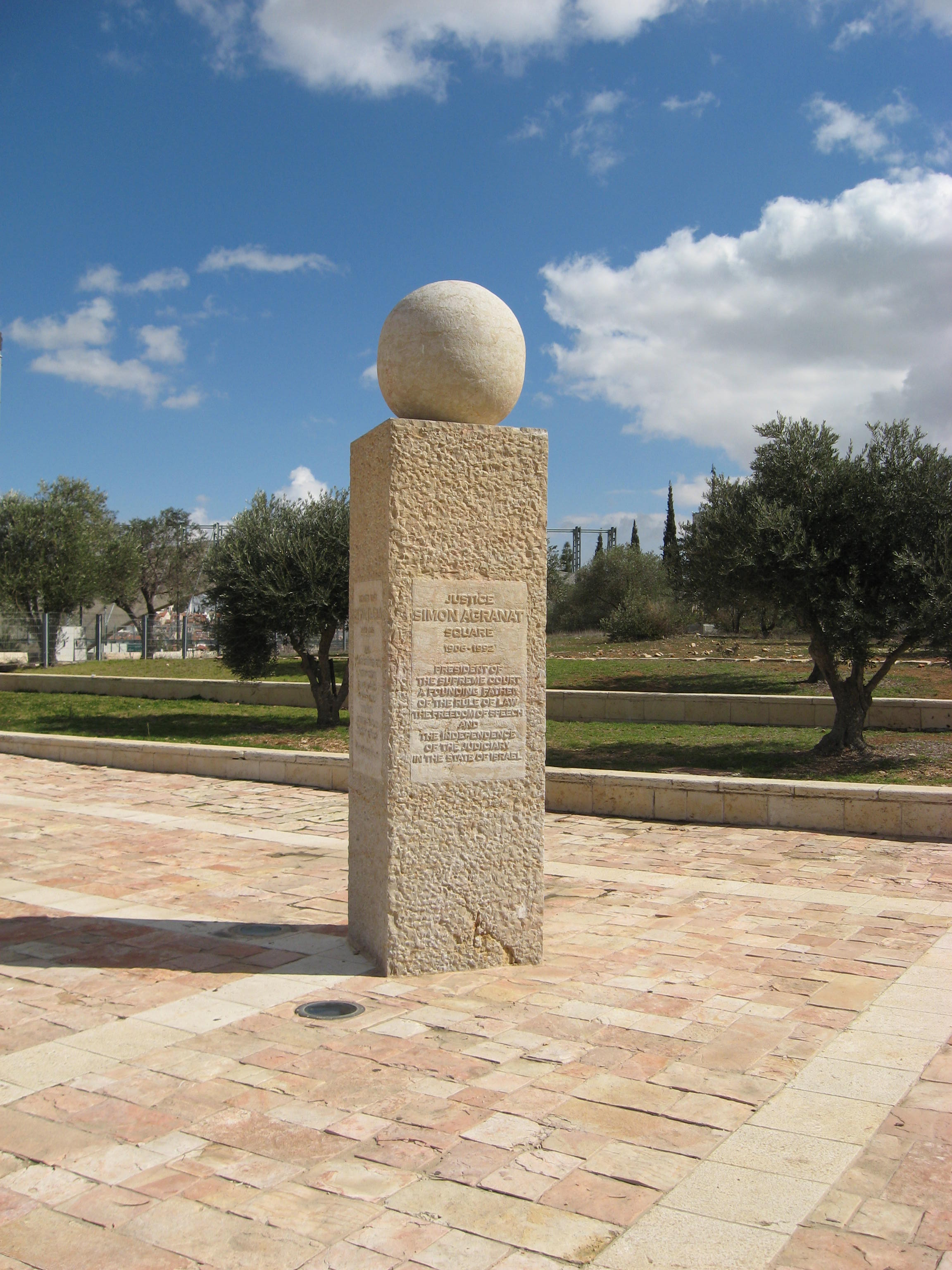
Agranat Plaza in 2011

In 1968, Agranat was awarded the Israel Prize for his contribution to Israeli jurisprudence.

A plaza at the entrance to the Israeli Supreme Court is named after Agranat.

== See also ==
- List of Israel Prize recipients
