= István Irsai =

- אישטוואן עיר-שי
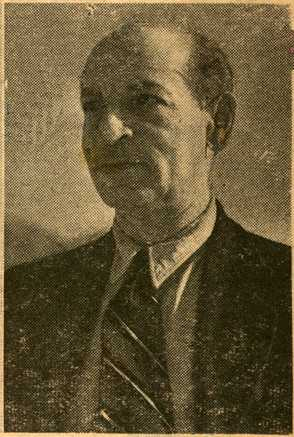
- Born: 1896; Budapest, Hungary
- Died: 1968 (aged 71–72); Israel
- Education: Budapest University of Technology and Economics
- Occupations: Architect, graphic designer

István Irsai (later Pesach Ir-Shay, Hebrew: פסח עיר-שי; b. 1896 – d. 1968) was a Hungarian-born Israeli architect and graphic designer.

== Early life ==
István Irsai was born in 1896 in Budapest, Hungary. He learned how to play the violin as a child. He served in the Austro-Hungarian Army during World War I. He subsequently studied architecture at the Budapest University of Technology and Economics.

== Adult life ==
Irsai started his career as an architect and graphic designer in Budapest. He lived in Mandate Palestine from 1925 to 1929, when he designed the Hebrew font Haim. During that time, he also designed stage sets in theatres as well as houses in the Bauhaus architectural style. He returned to Hungary in 1929, where he worked as a graphic designer until 1944.

Irsai was deported to the Bergen-Belsen concentration camp in 1944, but he managed to escape on the Kastner train. He emigrated to Israel, where he was a graphic designer. He designed posters for Modiano and Tungsram, among other companies. He also designed Zionist-themed posters to promote the state of Israel.

== Death ==
Irsai died in 1968 in Israel.
