= Új Kelet =

Hungarian-language Jewish newspaper

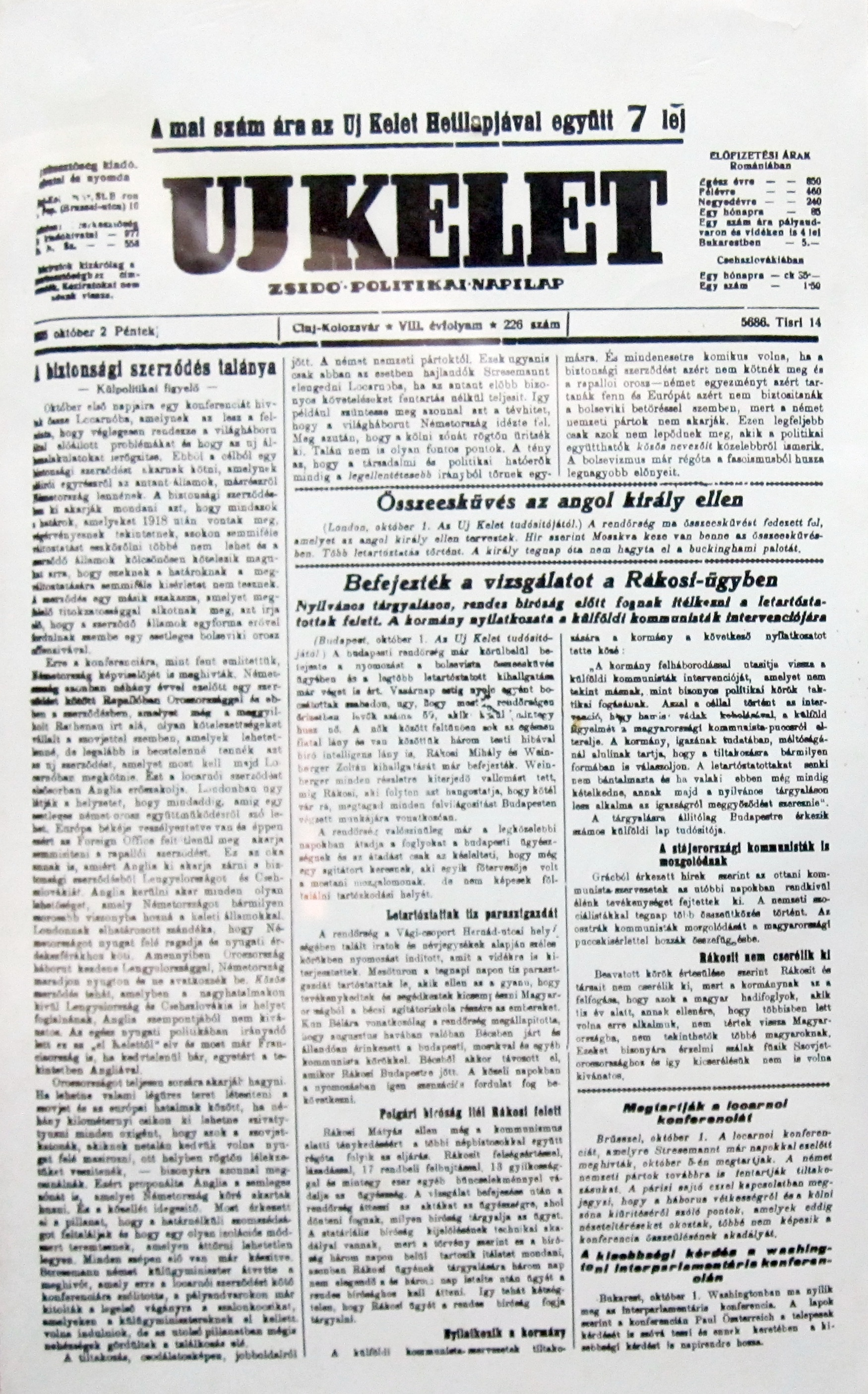
- Type: Weekly newspaper (1918–1920); Daily newspaper (from 1920–38 and 1948–2000); Weekly newspaper (2000–2015); Monthly newspaper (from 2016)
- Editor: Eva Vadasz, Istvan J. Bedo, Anna Sebő, Sara Salamon, Kristof Steiner
- Founded: 1918
- Language: Hungarian
- Headquarters: Transylvania (1918–1940); Tel Aviv (from 1948)
- Country: Romania (1918–1940); Israel (from 1948)
- Website: https://ujkelet.live

Új Kelet (pronounced [ˈuːj ˈkɛlɛt]; Hungarian translation: "New East") is a Hungarian-language Zionist Jewish newspaper published first in Kolozsvár (Cluj) in Transylvania, Romania in 1918. Prior to the annexation of Transylvania to Hungary in 1940 when it ceased publishing, it was the preeminent periodical for Hungarian-speaking Jewry in the world. After an 8-year break from its final publication in 1940, it was reestablished in Tel Aviv, Israel in 1948.

== History ==
Under the initiative of Chaim Weiszburg, a leader of the Zionist movement, Új Kelet was launched as a weekly on December 19, 1918. The first editor was Béla Székely (c.1891–1955), one of the two cofounders, who was succeeded in 1919 by Dr. Ernő Marton (1896–1960), the other cofounder. It became a daily in 1920 under Marton's editorship. It also published a literary review, Föld (The Soil), first as a monthly and later as a weekly supplement.

In 1920, antisemitic activity in Cluj increased after its incorporation into Romania. Jews were expelled from government positions (Marton had become deputy mayor) and from the university. In 1927, antisemitic university students destroyed Új Kelet's printing presses.

From 1927 until the end of its Transylvanian period, the editor was Ferenc Jámbor. After the Hungarian annexation of Cluj in 1940, the Horthy regime banned the paper due to its strong Zionist leanings. Marton emigrated to Palestine (Eretz Israel) after World War II, and in 1948, the paper reemerged under his editorship with Dezső Schön in Tel Aviv. Among the writers at the newspaper after its reestablishment in Israel were Alexander Sauber, Rezső Kastner, Yossef Lapid, Ephraim Kishon, Ottó Rappaport, Elemer Diamant, David Drori, and Pal Benedek. The paper became a weekly publication from 2000 to 2015. From 2016 onward, it has been published monthly.

From 1993 to 2015 George Edri was the owner of Új Kelet. The new editorial published Új Kelet was the main Hungarian-language independent newspaper in Israel between 2015 and 2020 on a monthly basis, and from 2020 on a three-monthly basis.

== Editors ==
- Editor in Chief: Eva Vadasz
- Creative Art: Kristof Steiner
- Graphic Design: Julia Szasz, Sara Salamon, Lou Kiss
- Editors: Istvan J. Bedo, Anna Sebo
- Print: Hadfus Hechadash Ltd., Rishon Letzion

Contributors: Arje Singer, Avi ben Giora, Balázs Ibi, Borgula András, Egervári Vera, Frank Peti, Grünhut Éva, Halmos László, Halmos Sándor, Korányi Eszter, Krasznai Éva, Lévai György, Markovits Mária, Markovic Radmila, Dr. Paszternák András, Róna Éva, Schnapp Lea, Steiner Kristóf, Szabó Orsi, Surányi J. András.
