= Béla Zsolt =

Hungarian writer

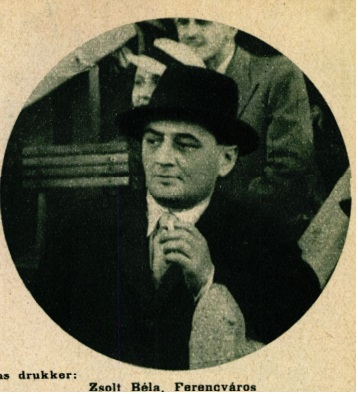
Zsolt in 1935

Béla Zsolt (born as Béla Steiner, 8 January 1895 – 6 February 1949) was a Hungarian radical socialist journalist and politician. He wrote one of the earliest Holocaust memoirs, Nine Suitcases (Kilenc koffer in Hungarian). Tibor Fischer has called it "Hungary's finest contribution to Holocaust writing", warning that it is "not for the squeamish". It has been translated into English by Ladislaus Löb.

== Early life ==
Zsolt was born in 1895, in Komárom. Before World War I and whilst still a young man, Zsolt was already considered an outstanding representative of the Hungarian Decadence movement. In the tumultuous years of revolution, 1918 and 1919, he was a vehement advocate for a bourgeois-liberal regime and opponent of the soviet republics and Horthy's emerging Christian-nationalist corporate state. In the intervening years between the wars, Zsolt gains recognition as a playwright, novelist and political journalist. He blamed "folksy populists . . . who decried urban Western civilization and championed a chauvinistic system based on the alleged strength and purity of an unspoiled Magyar race rooted in the Hungarian countryside" for the Hungarian right wing government's rise to power.

== Holocaust in Hungary ==
Like thousands of other Hungarian Jews in World War II Béla Zsolt served in a forced labor battalion on the Ukrainian eastern front. Many of Hungary's intellectuals did not survive working in these battalions. Zsolt worked as a gravedigger as White Ukrainians, Nazis and Hungarian soldiers burnt villages. He describes how the inhabitants "tumble all over the ground, into the glowing ashes" as they are shot while fleeing.

By spring 1944, after the Nazis invaded Hungary during Operation Margarethe, Szolt was arrested by Hungarian fascists and held at the Nagyvárad ghetto. Located just across the border from Hungary in Romania, known today as Oradea, it became a collection point for Hungarian Jews. Zsolt's step-daughter Eva Heyman was among those deported to Poland; she lost her life in Auschwitz. Her diary was published after the war.

As part of the so-called 'Kasztner train' Zsolt's freedom, along with that of a thousand other Hungarian Jews, was bought from the Nazis. He spent the second half of 1944 in Bergen-Belsen with his wife awaiting emigration. Their move to Switzerland followed in December.

Following his return to Hungary in 1945 Zsolt founded the Hungarian Radical Party, whose newspaper Haladás ("Progress") he edited. Zsolt was elected to the National Assembly of Hungary at his second attempt in 1947. He did not live to see the ultimate seizure of power by the communists. Béla Zsolt died in 1949 in Budapest following a serious illness. His wife Agnes, who struggled with grief over the deaths of her parents and her daughter Eva Heyman in Auschwitz, took her own life that same year.

== Nine Suitcases ==
Zsolt's memoir Nine Suitcases has been called "Hungary's finest contribution to Holocaust writing". The memoir is noted for its black humor and the author "a cool, urbane guide to the horrors". There are relatively few memoirs written by Hungarian survivors, some published posthumously such as Miklós Radnóti. Though Nine Suitcases, considered one of the best, was one of the first memoirs to be serialized in 1946–1947, Zsolt died before he finished editing the text, and it wasn't available in English until Löb's translation was published 60 years later.

Zsolt's text can be difficult to follow in its examination of the history of Jews in Hungary for readers unfamiliar with the history, but Löb's translation includes an introduction and footnotes. Zsolt was assimilated and did not hold the Yiddish-speaking Hassidim he was interned with in high regard.

English writer Ian Thomson has written:

In unsparing detail, Zsolt describes the bestial insouciance of the ghetto's Hungarian guards who beat and tormented old women and children. Nazi stooges, these men stopped at nothing in their pursuit of money and jewellery.

Zsolt has been described as apathetic and cunning, traits that have been credited with helping to keep him alive: "At times his stoicism verges on the distasteful, and there is a complete absence of special pleading." He describes the violence of the Nazis in disbelief: "They are killing us for the sake of objects".

The book, which condemns the Hungarian Catholic Church and Hungarian nationalists for anti-semitism, was banned for being "insufficiently propagandist" in Communist Hungary for 40 years.

== See also ==
Willy Cohn

Victor Klemperer

Mihail Sebastian
