= Kurt Becher =

SS officer (1909–1995)

Kurt Andreas Ernst Becher (12 September 1909 – 8 August 1995) was a mid-ranking SS commander who was Special Commissioner of all Concentration Camps (Reichssonderkommissar für sämtliche Konzentrationslager), and Chief of the Economic Department of the SS Command in Hungary during the German occupation in 1944. He is best known for having traded Jewish lives for money during the Holocaust.

== SS background ==
The state archives records of Hamburg on Becher's parents and grandparents indicate he was from modest background. His maternal grandfather was Andreas Wieck, a shoemaker, and his paternal grandfather, Julius Becher, a bricklayer. His father Hermann Becher was (in 1905) listed as a clerk in Ludwig Krenzien's general store in a suburb of Hamburg. Hermann Becher married Frieda Dora Alexandrine Wieck in 1906, and they moved into a rented apartment in a 12-party-building at Hasselbrookstrasse 15, Hamburg. In 1919, they moved to a single family house in Wandsbek, where records indicate Hermann was a commercial traveller.

He testified during the Nuremberg Trials that he had joined the SS because from 1932 he had been actively engaged in horseback riding, and in 1934, his instructor had advised him to enter the SS cavalry regiment (the Reiter-SS). Hannah Arendt suggests that the only reason Becher stressed this story was that the Nuremberg Tribunal had excluded the Reiter-SS from its list of criminal organizations.

Becher served as an SS major in Poland and Russia, as part of the SS-Totenkopfverbände, which perfected the techniques for killing Jews. He was appointed Special Commissioner of all Concentration Camps (Reichssonderkommissar für sämtliche Konzentrationslager), and Chief of the Economic Department of the SS Command in Hungary, by Heinrich Himmler. The "Economic Department" was tasked with extracting maximal economic value from Jews, which included confiscating goods and property, and selling or using belongings and body parts, including shorn hair and gold extracted from teeth.

== In Hungary ==
Becher became the main buyer of horses for the SS and, according to his own testimony, was sent to Hungary in March 1944, when Germany invaded that country, to buy 20,000 horses. Arendt posited that this story is unlikely to be true, because as soon as he arrived in Budapest, he began to engage in a series of negotiations with the heads of several large Jewish business concerns.

His later actions showed that his goal was rather to extort as much wealth as possible from Hungary's Jews on behalf of Himmler, the head of the SS. From 1944 to 1945, he collected large sums of money, jewellery, and precious metals, worth an estimated 8,600,000 Swiss francs, from Hungarian Jews, a portion of which travelled with him in six large suitcases, in what became known as the "Becher Deposit".

In January 1945, he was appointed as Special Reich Commissioner for all the concentration camps by Himmler.

He was arrested in May 1945 by the Allies and imprisoned at Nuremberg but was not prosecuted as a war criminal, serving only as a witness during the Nuremberg trials, as a result of a statement provided on his behalf by Rezső Kasztner, a leading member of the Jewish Aid and Rescue Committee in Hungary.

In an affidavit that Kasztner submitted before the court at Nuremberg, Kasztner states: "There can be no doubt about it that Becher belongs to the very few SS leaders having the courage to oppose the program of annihilation of the Jews, and trying to rescue human lives...that Kurt Becher did everything within the realm of possibilities to save innocent human beings from the blind fury of the Nazi leaders...I never doubted for one moment the good intentions of Kurt Becher etc."

Kasztner was the plaintiff in a trial in which the Jerusalem District Court found that he was complicit in the Nazi murder of 740,000 Hungarian Jews, and had "sold his soul to the devil". The court found that Kasztner collaborated with the Nazis' extermination of the Jews in Hungary, and by saving the war criminal Kurt Becher from its penalty. Kasztner was subsequently assassinated in Israel in March 1957. The Supreme Court of Israel overturned the judgment against Kasztner in 1958, except for the section exonerating Becher, whose status as a war criminal was determined in a 35-page decision; the Supreme Court ruled that Kasztner's affidavit was perjurious, as Kasztner had known of Becher's activities during the war.

The Becher Deposit was eventually sold for $55,000, far less than its estimated value. Some of the discrepancy was due to the hyperinflation which made the Hungarian pengő worthless after the war, but the Hungarian officials had already confiscated most of the cash and foreign currency held by Jews, so most passengers paid "in the form of jewelry, gold (gold jewelry, gold bullions and Napoleon gold), platinum, precious stones, and other valuables." Dagobert Arian of the Jewish Agency suggested that Becher had hidden most of his loot before he was captured, and that this explained the difference.

Historian Yehuda Bauer writes that Becher is known to have had specific Jewish treasures in his possession, which came from payments made to him by the Aid and Rescue Committee, and from property he had confiscated in Hungary. Of the luggage that made up the Becher Deposit, Becher gave one case to Moshe Schweiger (an associate of Rudolf Kastner), who had been released from Mauthausen specifically to take possession of the case. On 24 May 1945, Subsection B of the 215th American Counter Intelligence Corps (CIC) detachment found 18.7 pounds of gold, 4.4 pounds of platinum, and some jewelry hidden under beds in a house Becher had been living in, and on 30 May, the suitcase Becher had given to Schweiger was handed over to the CIC. On 25 June some other Jewish refugees Becher had been using as couriers handed in gold and paper shares.

== Postwar activities ==
After the war, Becher was spared prosecution primarily through the testimony of Kasztner, his negotiating partner from his time in Budapest. He later became a prosperous businessman in Bremen. Becher was the president of many corporations, including the Cologne-Handel Gesellschaft, which did extensive business with the Israeli government.

By 1960 he was one of the wealthiest men in West Germany, with estimated assets of US$30 million. He came to public attention once again in 1961 when he served as a witness for the prosecution during the trial in Jerusalem of SS officer Adolf Eichmann. He provided his testimony from his home in Germany, because he was unwilling to travel to Israel. He reportedly died a wealthy man.

== See also ==
- Joel Brand
- Kastner train
- Chaim Michael Dov Weissmandl
- Rudolf Vrba
- Alfred Wetzler
- History of the Jews in Hungary
- Ein Lied von Liebe und Tod (film)

== Awards ==
- German Cross in Gold on 15 January 1943 as SS-Hauptsturmführer in the SS-Kampfgruppe "Fegelein"
