= Kolozsvár Ghetto =

Coordinates: 46°47′45.47″N 23°36′57.86″E

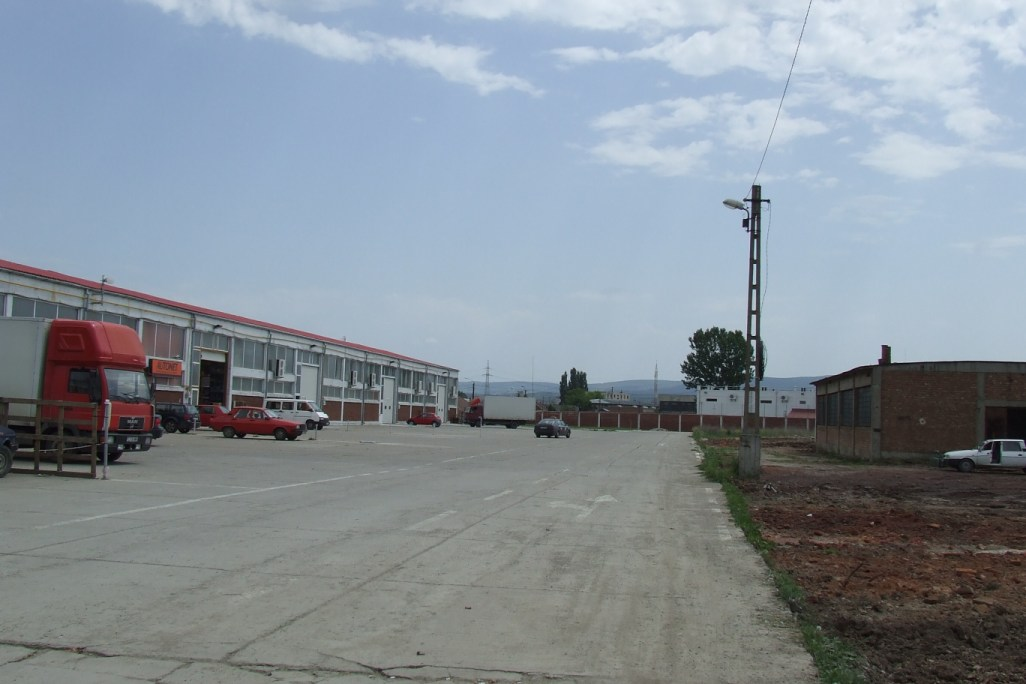
Iris brickyard, the site of the ghetto (May 2007)

The Kolozsvár Ghetto was one of the lesser-known Jewish ghettos of the World War II era. The ghetto was located in the city of Kolozsvár, then Kingdom of Hungary (now Cluj-Napoca, Romania). Between the signing of the Treaty of Trianon in 1920 and the Second Vienna Award in 1940, Cluj was a part of Greater Romania.

== History ==
Hungarian Prime Minister Miklós Kállay, who had been in office from 1942, had the knowledge and the approval of Hungarian Regent Miklós Horthy to seek secretly at negotiating a separate peace with the Allies in early 1944. Hitler wanted to prevent the Hungarians from turning against Germany. On 12 March 1944, German troops received orders by Hitler to capture critical Hungarian facilities.

Hitler invited Horthy to the Palace of Klessheim, near of Salzburg, on 15 March. As both heads of state conducted their negotiations at the Schloss Klessheim, German forces quietly marched from Reichsgaue of the Ostmark into Hungary. The meeting served merely as a German ruse to keep Horthy out of the country and to leave the Hungarian Army without orders.

Negotiations between Horthy and Hitler lasted until 18 March, when Horthy boarded a train to return home. On 19 March, the occupation of Hungary began.

When Horthy arrived in Budapest, German soldiers were waiting for him at the station. Horthy was told by Dietrich von Jagow, the German minister-plenipotentiary that Hungary could remain sovereign only if he removed Kállay for a government that would co-operate fully with the Germans. Otherwise, Hungary would be subject to an undisguised occupation. Horthy appointed Döme Sztójay as prime minister to appease German concerns.

On March 27, Nazi troops started their occupation of Kolozsvár. On May 3, the ghettoization of Kolozsvár Jews began, and was completed within one week.

== Life in the Ghetto ==
The Jews were concentrated in the Iris brickyard, in the northern part of the city. This area consisted mostly of shacks used for drying bricks and tiles. The ghetto had practically no facilities for the approximately eighteen thousand Jews who were assembled there from Kolozsvár and the surrounding Kolozs County. The concentration of the Jews has been carried out by the local administrative and police authorities with the cooperation of Nazi SS (Schutzstaffel) advisers, including SS-Captain (SS-Hauptsturmfuhrer) Dieter Wisliceny. The ghetto was under the command of László Urbán, the local police chief of Cluj. The ghetto's internal administration was entrusted to a Jewish Council (Judenrat). Members of this council included József Fischer (as head), Rabbi Akiba Glasner, Rabbi Mozes Weinberger, and Ernő Márton. As in all other ghettos in Hungary, the local brickyard also had a "mint," a special building where the police tortured Jews into revealing where they had hidden their valuables.

== Deportation ==
The Kolozsvár Ghetto was liquidated in six transports to Auschwitz (now Oświęcim, Poland), with the first deportation occurring on 25 May, and the last on 9 June. Altogether 16,148 inhabitants of the ghetto were deported. Upon arrival, 75% of them were sent to the gas chambers. The remaining were subjected to disease and starvation.

== After the war ==
Following the liberation of the Auschwitz concentration camp in January 1945, only a small portion of the survivors ended up returning to Cluj. In June 1945, the Jewish population of Cluj was approximately 1,000.
