= Malchiel Gruenwald =

Israeli businessman and citizen journalist

- מלכיאל גרינוולד
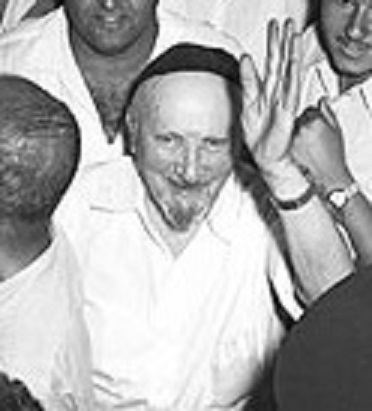
- Born: 1882
- Died: 1968 (aged 85–86)
- Occupations: Hotelier, journalist, stamp collector
- Known for: Accusing Rudolf Kastner of Nazi collaboration

Malchiel Gruenwald (Hebrew: מלכיאל גרינוולד; also written Grünwald, Gruenvald, and Greenwald; 1882–1968) was an Israeli hotelier, amateur journalist, and stamp collector, who came to public attention in 1953, when he accused an Israeli government employee, Rudolf Kastner, of having collaborated with the Nazis during the Holocaust.

== Biography ==
Gruenwald was born in Hungary, and lived there and in Vienna, working in a number of trades, including as a part-time journalist. In 1937, while in Vienna with his family, he was caught in a pogrom in which his teeth were smashed out, tongue slashed, arms and legs broken, and he was beaten unconscious and left for dead.

In 1938, when he had recovered from his injuries, he emigrated to Mandatory Palestine along with his wife, son Itzhak, and daughter Rina. There, he settled in Jerusalem, where, with his life savings, he bought the "Hotel Austria", a ten-room hotel on Zion Square that he ran with his wife.

The Gruenwalds as a family were committed Zionists. After the White Paper of 1939, Malchiel and his two brothers assisted illegal immigration to Palestine, organizing immigrant runs, particularly of Jews trying to escape the Holocaust. His son joined the Irgun, and was killed in the battle for Mount Zion during the 1948 Arab-Israeli War, after which Gruenwald renamed the hotel the "Mount Zion Hotel". His daughter meanwhile worked as a nurse in a Hadassah hospital by day, and at night tended to the Irgun's wounded.

Shlomo Aronson, in his book Hitler, the Allies, and the Jews, claims that Gruenwald's personal file, released by Israeli Home Intelligence, provides a very different picture of Gruenwald's early activities, saying Gruenwald was a criminal in Hungary and Austria who would inform on Labour Zionists, threaten Orthodox leaders and swindle refugees. The file also purportedly states that Gruenwald asked British authorities to stop a ship carrying refugees, the SS Patria, from entering Palestine.

== Political pamphlets ==
In the early 1950s, Gruenwald decided to devote his remaining years to journalism, but as Ben Hecht writes, no one was about to employ a 72-year-old man who wrote no Hebrew. Gruenwald therefore began self-publishing a more-or-less weekly three-page mimeographed pamphlet, which he would have translated from German into Hebrew before distributing up to 1,000 copies himself, by mail or by hand in local cafés, all free of charge. Titled Michtavim el haveray be'Mizrahi ("Letters to my Friends in Mizrahi"), the pamphlets consisted of attacks "on leaders who were corrupt, on religious officials who, in his opinion, were not worthy of their positions, on greedy public officials, and on people in authority". Gruenwald's targets included various leaders of religious groups, including Mizrahi, and ministers and members of the Knesset and other politicians from all parties, in particular those from the ruling Mapai party. Occasionally, one of the targets of his pamphlets would threaten to sue him for libel; in response, Gruenwald would make a public apology, often in the "Café Vienna", which occupied the ground floor of his hotel.

In August 1952, he published the 51st such pamphlet. This one accused Rudolf Kastner — the press spokesman for the Israeli Ministry of Commerce and Industry, a senior member of Mapai, and the former de facto head of the Hungarian-Jewish Aid and Rescue Committee during the Holocaust — of being a Nazi collaborator. The pamphlet alleged that Kastner's collaboration had resulted in the deaths of 400,000 Jews in Hungary, and that after the war, he had testified at the Nuremberg trials on behalf of SS Standartenführer (colonel) Kurt Becher, thereby saving him from punishment for his war crimes. According to Hecht, Gruenwald obtained his information from an anonymous letter and a conversation with a stranger at the "Café Vienna", though a 1955 Time Magazine article says he was attempting to discover who had betrayed his relatives in Hungary, and drew his conclusions "after poring through mountains of yellowed records".

The actual text of the pamphlet included the following:

I have waited a long time to expose this careerist whom I consider, because of his collaboration with the Nazis, an indirect murderer of my dear people.
Who is this spokesman for the Ministry of Trade and Industry; who is this big shot leader of the Hungarian Jews; who is this fellow who has been put high on the list of candidates for Israel's parliament by the government party Mapai?
This character is Dr. Rudolf Kastner, political adventurer, driven by sickly megalomania.
For whom, on whose account, Dr. Kastner, did you go like a thief in the night to Nuremberg to become a witness for the defense of S.S. Colonel Kurt Becher, the murderer of Jews, the man who wallowed in the blood of our brothers in Hungary? Kurt Becher - Economic Administrator of the Gestapo!
Why did you save him from the death penalty which he had so richly earned?
You flew to Nuremberg to save a mass murderer of Jews. What induced you to do that?
What kind of gentleman's agreement was there between this murderer Becher and this man who I accuse as a collaborator with the Nazis?
And it is this same Kastner that Mapai has taken to its bosom and place high on its list of officials.
My God! Kastner's deeds in Budapest cost us the lives of hundreds of thousands of Jews!
We demand an impartial public committee of investigation.
Kastner must be removed from the politics and from the society of this land.
We shall keep this on our agenda until the evil is ended.

Gruenwald concluded his charges as follows:

He wanted to save himself, so that Becher would not reveal to international court their deals and their joint acts of robbery...
Where now is the money of the Jews of Hungary, millions for which no accounting is given...
He saved no fewer than fifty-two of his relatives, and hundreds of other Jews—most of whom had converted to Christianity—bought their rescue from Kastner by paying millions! That's how Kastner saved the members of Mapai...
He saved people with connections, made a fortune in the process. But thousands of senior Zionists, members of the Mizrahi and ultra-religious parties—these, Kastner left in the valley of the shadow of death.

The only Israeli newspaper to pay attention to Kastner's charges was Herut. In it, political columnist Yoel Marcus stated that for three years, Hungarian Jews had been claiming that "a man with an official position" had testified for Nazi war criminals, been involved in shady deals, and had made profits "at the expense of operations to rescue Jews". Marcus challenged Kastner to exonerate himself. Kastner's superior, the Minister of Commerce and Industry, Dov Yoseph, felt that whether Kastner wanted to take action regarding these accusations was purely a personal matter. However, Attorney General Haim Cohen felt that the charges were serious enough that Kastner would either have to resign or attempt to clear his name. In Cohen's words, "in our new, pure, ideal State ... a man cannot officiate in a senior position ... when there is a stain on him, or even only a grave suspicion of collaboration with the Nazis". Feeling he had no choice, Kastner allowed the Israeli government to file a lawsuit on his behalf against Gruenwald.

== Kastner trial ==
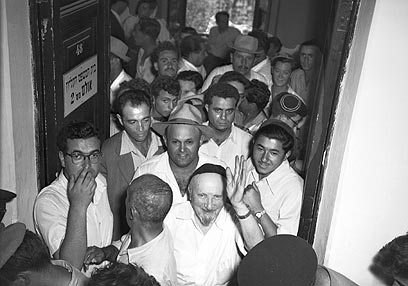
Gruenwald (front) in the Supreme Court of Israel.

In 1953, Cohen, who also held the position of Minister of Justice, filed criminal defamation charges against Gruenwald; according to Asher Maoz, this was "against the wishes of many public figures, including the person who later re-occupied the post of minister of justice, Pinhas Rosen, and the minister in charge of Kastner, Dov Yoseph". Gruenwald engaged as his lawyer Shmuel Tamir, a 31-year-old lawyer who had been born in Jerusalem as Shmuel Katzenelson. Tamir was the son of Reuven Katzenelson, a member of the Jewish Legion and Joseph Trumpeldor's sergeant and companion in the Battle of Gallipoli, and the nephew of Joseph Katzenelson, a companion of Zeev Jabotinsky, and one of the Irgun's two Chiefs of Illegal Immigration. Shmuel Katzenelson joined the Irgun at the age of 15, and was nicknamed Tamir ("tall and straight" in Hebrew), a name he later adopted legally. Tamir had been the Irgun's Chief of Intelligence in Jerusalem, and Gruenwald's daughter Rina had been under his command as a nurse.

The trial, which government lawyers expected to last four days, lasted for two years, and resulted in 1955 in an acquittal of Gruenwald and a statement from the judge that Kastner had "sold his soul to the devil". The basis of the allegation and the judge's statement was that Kastner had collaborated with SS officer Hermann Krumey, and later Adolf Eichmann, by betraying the Hungarian Jewish masses in return for the rescue of a few hundred Jewish VIPs. The judge also condemned Kastner because after the war, he had given a positive affidavit on behalf of another SS officer, Kurt Becher, which convinced the Nuremberg authorities not to prosecute Becher for war crimes. The Supreme Court overturned the collaboration finding in 1958, but by then Kastner had already been assassinated.

== Bibliography ==
- "On Trial",Time magazine, Foreign News, 11 July 1955.
- Bauer, Yehuda. Jews for Sale: Nazi-Jewish Negotiations, 1933-1945, Yale University Press, 1994. ISBN 0-300-06852-2
- Hecht, Ben. Perfidy, Milah Press, first published in 1961; this edition 1999. ISBN 0-9646886-3-8
- Maoz, Asher. Historical Adjudication: Courts of Law, Commissions of Inquiry, and "Historical Truth", Law and History Review, University of Illinois Press, Vol. 18. No. 3, Fall 2000.
- Segev, Tom. The Seventh Million: Israelis and the Holocaust, New York: Henry Holt (Owl Books edition), 2000, ISBN 0-8050-6660-8.
- Bogdanor, Paul. Kasztner's Crime, Oxfordshire: Routledge (Jewish Studies Series), 2016. ISBN 978-1412864435.
