= Alan Bestic =

Irish journalist

Alan "Sammy" Bestic (11 July 1921 – 12 May 2014) was an Irish journalist. The author of several books, including The Importance of Being Irish (1969), he became best known for having ghostwritten the memoirs of Rudolf Vrba, who escaped from the Auschwitz concentration camp and co-wrote the Vrba–Wetzler report (1944).

Bestic originally wrote up Vrba's story in five installments for the Daily Herald, beginning with the headline "I Warned the World of Eichmann's Murders" on 27 February 1961. The stories coincided with increased interest in the Holocaust because of the forthcoming trial in Jerusalem of Adolf Eichmann, who had been captured in Argentina in 1960. After the Daily Herald stories, Bestic ghostwrote Vrba's book, which was published with a joint byline as I Cannot Forgive (1963).

== Early life ==
Bestic attended Kingstown Grammar school in Dublin. He began working as a journalist for the Irish Times, then left Dublin in 1951 for a job in Fleet Street, London.

== Selected works ==
- Vrba, Rudolf; Bestic, Alan (1963). I Cannot Forgive. London: Sidgwick and Jackson. OCLC 77394.
- Bestic, Alan (1969). The Importance of Being Irish. London: Cassell. OCLC 490356452.

Turn Me On Man 1966 Tandem Books
