= Ruth Linn =

Israeli professor

- רות לין
- Born: Israel
- Education: Hebrew Reali School; Boston University (EdD, 1981)
- Organization: University of Haifa
- Known for: Moral psychology, Holocaust research
- Notable work: Escaping Auschwitz: A Culture of Forgetting (2004)
- Awards: Erikson Award, 1990
- Website: "Prof. Ruth Linn". University of Haifa.

Ruth Linn (Hebrew: רות לין) is a professor in the Department of Counseling and Human Development at the University of Haifa. Specializing in moral psychology, she has focused on moral disobedience, including resistance to authority.

Linn is the author of five books, including Not Shooting and Not Crying: Psychological Inquiry into Moral Disobedience (1989); Conscience at War: the Israeli Soldier as a Moral Critic (1996); and Escaping Auschwitz: A Culture of Forgetting (2004).

== Education ==
Born in Israel, Linn attended the Hebrew Reali School in Haifa, after which she was conscripted, in 1968 aged 18, into the Israel Defence Forces. She obtained her doctorate in education (EdD) from Boston University in 1981.

== Career ==
=== Positions held ===
Linn taught in the Faculty of Education at the University of Haifa from 1982, and from 2001 to 2006 served as its dean. She has held visiting scholarships at Harvard University, the University of Maryland, the University of British Columbia, and the National Institute of Mental Health.

=== Auschwitz research ===
In 1998, Linn arranged for the University of Haifa to award an honorary doctorate to Rudolf Vrba, who escaped from the Auschwitz concentration camp in April 1944, in recognition of his escape and his contribution to Holocaust education. She also arranged for the University of Haifa Press to publish Vrba's memoirs and the Vrba–Wetzler report in Hebrew. Linn subsequently wrote Escaping Auschwitz (2004), a book about Vrba.

=== Awards ===
Linn was awarded the Erikson Award by the International Society of Political Psychology in 1990 for her work on Israeli soldiers and conscientious objection.

== Personal life ==
Linn is married with three children.

== Selected works ==
- (1989). Not Shooting and Not Crying: Psychological Inquiry into Moral Disobedience. New York: Greenwood Press. 1989. ISBN 978-0-313-26497-9.
- (1996). Conscience at War: the Israeli Soldier as a Moral Critic. Albany: State University of New York Press. March 1996. ISBN 978-0-7914-2778-1.
- (2002). Mature Unwed Mothers: Narratives of Moral Resistance. New York: Kluwer Academic/Plenum Publishers. 2002. ISBN 978-0-306-46523-9.
- (2004). Escaping Auschwitz: A Culture of Forgetting. Ithaca: Cornell University Press. 2004. ISBN 0-8014-4130-7.
- (2004). "Voice, silence and memory after Auschwitz". In Lentin, R. (ed.). Representing the Shoah for the 21st Century. Oxford and New York: Berghahn Books. ISBN 978-1571818027
- (2008). "Between the 'Known' and the 'Could be Known': The case of the escape from Auschwitz". In Christina Guenther and Beth Griech-Polelle (eds.). Trajectories of Memory: Intergenerational Representations of the Holocaust in History and the Arts. Newcastle: Cambridge Scholars Publishing. 15–40. ISBN 978-1847186461
- (2011). "Rudolf Vrba and the Auschwitz reports: Conflicting historical interpretations". In Randolph L. Braham and W. J. vanden Heuvel (eds.). The Auschwitz Reports and the Holocaust in Hungary. New York: Columbia University Press, 153–210. ISBN 978-0880336888
- (2016) with Esther Dror. איך קרה ששרדת. (How Did You Survive). Tel Aviv: Hakibbutz Hameuchad Publications (Hebrew). OCLC 951010824
