= Henryk Świebocki =

Polish historian (born 1940)

Henryk Świebocki (born 1940) is a Polish historian. A senior custodian of the Auschwitz-Birkenau State Museum, Świebocki specializes in the resistance movement within the Auschwitz concentration camp in occupied Poland during World War II. He is the editor of London has been informed: Reports by Auschwitz escapees (1997); author of The Resistance Movement, volume IV of Auschwitz 1940–1945 (2000); and editor of People of Good Will (2009).

== Early life and education ==
Świebocki was born in Stary Sącz, Poland. His father, Karol Świebocki, was a member of Poland's Home Army who was imprisoned in Auschwitz as a political prisoner from 17 June 1942; he died on 10 August that year in a gas chamber in Auschwitz II–Birkenau, one of a group of 193 sick prisoners in the camp hospital that the Germans decided to gas. Świebocki's uncle, an artist, was also imprisoned in the camp, for three years, but he survived.

A graduate of Jagiellonian University, Świebocki has a doctorate in history. He joined the Historical Research Department of the Auschwitz State Museum in 1964.
