= Michael Fleming (historian) =

British historian

Michael Fleming is a British historian and professor at the Polish University Abroad in London.

Fleming is the author of National Minorities in Post-Communist Poland (2003); Communism, Nationalism and Ethnicity in Poland, 1944–1950 (2009); Auschwitz, the Allies and Censorship of the Holocaust (2014); and In the Shadow of the Holocaust: Poland, the United Nations War Crimes Commission, and the Search for Justice (2022).

== Education and career ==
Fleming graduated from the University of London and obtained his DPhil from the University of Oxford. He has held teaching positions at Jesus College, Oxford, Pembroke College, Oxford, the Academy of Humanities and Economics, Łódź, and the University of Warwick. He was a visiting researcher in Warsaw at the Institute of History, Polish Academy of Sciences, and in Pułtusk at the Pułtusk Academy of Humanities.

== Holocaust research ==
In Auschwitz, the Allies and Censorship of the Holocaust, Fleming seeks to show that the Allies knew in 1942 what was happening inside the German extermination camps. The Vrba-Wetzler report, written by two escapees from the Auschwitz concentration camp and distributed from April 1944, was not "the watershed moment in Allied knowledge of what was happening to the Jews inside Auschwitz, as is generally believed", writes Norman J. W. Goda in a review of Fleming's book. The Israel Journal of Foreign Affairs described the book as "undoubtedly one of the most important in the study of the Holocaust in the last twenty years".

== Awards ==
Fleming shared the Aquila Polonica Prize in 2011 and the Kulczycki Book Prize in 2015.

== Selected works ==
- Michael Fleming (2003). National Minorities in Post-communist Poland. Veritas Foundation Publication Centre. ISBN 978-1904639008.
- Michael Fleming (2009). Communism, Nationalism and Ethnicity in Poland, 1944–1950. Routledge. 206 pages. ISBN 978-1135276379.
- Michael Fleming (2014). Auschwitz, the Allies and Censorship of the Holocaust. Cambridge University Press. 406 pages. ISBN 978-1107062795.
- Michael Fleming (2022). In the Shadow of the Holocaust: Poland, the United Nations War Crimes Commission, and the Search for Justice. Cambridge University Press. 350 pages. doi:10.1017/9781009106719. ISBN 978-1009098984.
