= Vrba–Wetzler report =

Account of Auschwitz killings

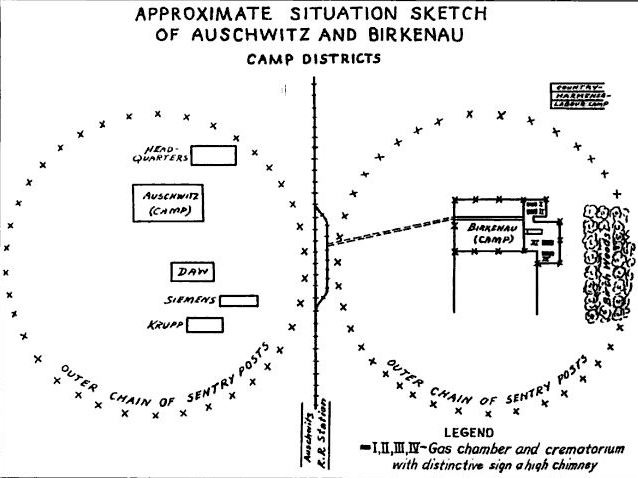
- Sketch from the report: left, Auschwitz I showing the DAW, Siemens and Krupp factories; right, Auschwitz II showing four gas chambers and crematoria.
- Location: Composed in Žilina, Slovakia, 25 April 1944
- Also known as: Auschwitz Protocols, Auschwitz Report, Auschwitz notebook
- Participants: Rudolf Vrba and Alfréd Wetzler
- Outcome: The report prompted an end to the mass deportation of Hungary's Jews to Auschwitz, saving around 200,000 lives.
- Website: "Full text of the report", German Historical Institute.

The Vrba–Wetzler report is one of three documents that comprise what is known as the Auschwitz Protocols, otherwise known as the Auschwitz Report or the Auschwitz notebook. It is a 33-page eye-witness account of the Auschwitz concentration camp in German-occupied Poland during the Holocaust.

Rudolf Vrba and Alfréd Wetzler, two Slovak Jews who escaped from Auschwitz on 10 April 1944, wrote the report by hand or dictated it, in Slovak, between 25 and 27 April, in Žilina, Slovakia. Oscar Krasniansky of the Slovak Jewish Council typed up the report and simultaneously translated it into German.

The Allies had known since November 1942 that Jews were being killed en masse in Auschwitz. The Vrba–Wetzler report was an early attempt to estimate the numbers and the most detailed description of the gas chambers to that point. The publication of parts of the report in June 1944 is credited with helping to persuade the Hungarian regent, Miklós Horthy, to halt the deportation of Hungary's Jews to Auschwitz, which had been proceeding at a rate of 12,000 a day since May 1944. The first full English translation of the report was published in November 1944 by the United States War Refugee Board.

== Auschwitz Protocols ==
The Vrba–Wetzler report is sometimes referred to as the Auschwitz Protocols, although in fact the Protocols incorporated information from three reports, including Vrba–Wetzler. Under the title "German Extermination Camps—Auschwitz and Birkenau", the Auschwitz Protocols was first published in full in English on 25 November 1944 by the Executive Office of the United States War Refugee Board. Miroslav Kárný writes it was published on the same day the last 13 prisoners, all women, were gassed or shot in crematorium II in Auschwitz-Birkenau. The document combined the material from the Vrba–Wetzler report and two others, which were submitted together in evidence at the Nuremberg Trials as document no. 022-L, exhibit no. 294-USA.

The Protocols included a seven-page report from Arnost Rosin and Czesław Mordowicz as chapter III to the Vrba–Wetzler report and an earlier report, known as the "Polish Major's report", written by Jerzy Tabeau. Tabeau escaped from Auschwitz on 19 November 1943 and compiled his report between December 1943 and January 1944. This was presented in the Protocols as the 19-page "Transport (The Polish Major's Report)". Rosin and Mordowicz escaped from Auschwitz on 27 May 1944, using the demotion they received after Vrba and Wetzler's escape a month earlier, and met up with those escapees in Slovakia to contribute to the Protocols. The full text of the English translation of the Protocols is in the archives of the War Refugee Board at the Franklin D. Roosevelt Presidential Library and Museum in New York.

== Contents ==
=== How it was written ===
Alfréd Wetzler

According to the report's first post-war Slovak edition, Oswiecim, hrobka štyroch miliónov ľudí ("Auschwitz, the tomb of four million"), published in Bratislava in 1946, the report was first written in Slovak by Vrba and Wetzler, beginning on 25 April 1944, and simultaneously translated into German by Oscar Krasniansky of the Slovak Jewish Council in Žilina. It was written and re-written several times. Wetzler wrote the first part, Vrba the third, and they wrote the second part together. They then worked on the whole thing together. Wetzler confirmed this version of how the report was written in a letter to Miroslav Kárný, dated 14 April 1982. Oscar Krasniansky, an engineer and stenographer, translated it from Slovak into German with the help of Gisela Steiner. They produced a 40-page report in German, which was completed by Thursday, 27 April. Vrba wrote that the report was also translated into Hungarian. The original Slovak version of the report was not preserved. Historians studying the Holocaust today usually base their research on the German translation, which Allied forces also used when translating the report into English shortly after the end of the war.

The Vrba–Wetzler report contains a detailed description of the geography and management of the camps, and of how the prisoners lived and died. It lists the transports that had arrived at Auschwitz since 1942, their place of origin, and the numbers "selected" for work or the gas chambers. Kárný writes that the report is an invaluable document because it provides details that were known only to prisoners, including, for example, that discharge forms were filled out for prisoners who had been gassed, indicating that death rates in the camp were actively falsified.

=== Crematoria ===
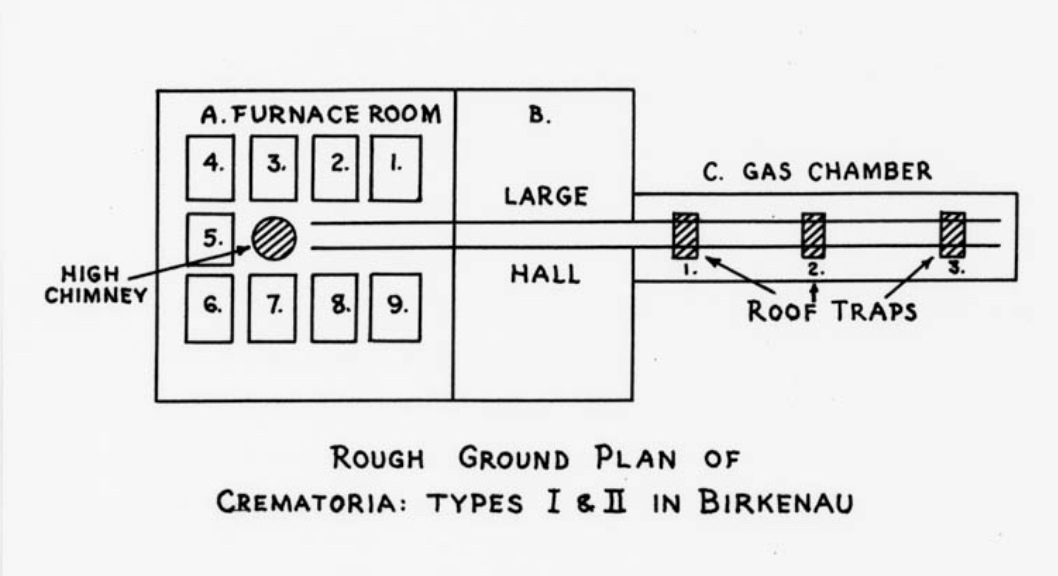
A sketch from the report, showing the rough layout of the crematoria

The report contains sketches and information about the layout of the gas chambers, describing the large room where victims were made to undress before being pushed into the gas chambers, as well as the attached crematoriums. In a deposition for the trial of Adolf Eichmann in 1961, and in his book I Cannot Forgive (1964), Vrba said that he and Wetzler obtained the information about the gas chambers and crematoria from the Sonderkommando Filip Müller and his colleagues, who worked there. Müller confirmed Vrba's story in his Eyewitness Auschwitz (1979). The report offered a description of the camp's four crematoria. (Note: Vrba-Wetzler report (two paragraph breaks have been inserted for ease of reading): "At present, there are four crematoria in operation at BIRKENAU, two large ones, I and II, and two smaller ones, III and IV. Those of type I and II consist of 3 parts, i. e.,: (A) the furnace room; (B) the large halls; and (C) the gas chamber. A huge chimney rises from the furnace room around which are grouped nine furnaces, each having four openings. Each opening can take three normal corpses at once and after an hour and a half the bodies are completely burned. This corresponds to a daily capacity of about 2,000 bodies. Next to this is a large "reception hall" which is arranged so as to give the impression of the antechamber of a bathing establishment. It holds 2,000 people and apparently there is a similar waiting room of the floor below. From there a door and a few steps lead down into the very long and narrow gas chamber. The walls of this chamber are also camouflaged with simulated entries to shower rooms in order to mislead the victims. This roof is fitted with three traps which can be hermetically closed from the outside. A track leads from the gas chamber to the furnace room. "The gassing takes place as follows: The unfortunate victims are brought into hall (B), where they are told to undress. To complete the fiction that they are going to bathe, each person receives a towel and a small piece of soap issued by two men clad in white coats. They are then crowded into the gas chamber (C) in such numbers there is, of course, only standing room. To compress this crowd into the narrow space, shots are often fired to induce those already at the far end to huddle still closer together. "When everybody is inside, the heavy doors are closed. Then there is a short pause, presumably to allow the room temperature to rise to a certain level, after which SS men with gas masks climb on the roof, open the traps, and shake down a preparation in powder form out of tin cans labeled 'CYKLON For use against vermin', which is manufactured by a Hamburg concern. It is presumed that this is a 'CYANIDE' mixture of some sort which turns into gas at a certain temperature. After three minutes everyone in the chamber is dead. No one is known to have survived this ordeal, although it was not uncommon to discover signs of life after the primitive measures employed in the Birch Wood [Birkenau]. The chamber is then opened, aired, and the 'special squad' carts the bodies on flat trucks to the furnace rooms, where the burning takes place. Crematoria III and IV work on nearly the same principle, but their capacity is only half as large. Thus, the total capacity of the four cremating and gassing plants at BIRKENAU amounts to about 6,000 daily.")

Jean-Claude Pressac, a French specialist on the gas chambers, concluded in 1989 that, while the report was wrong on certain issues, it "has the merit of describing exactly the gassing process in type II/III Krematorien as from mid-March 1943. It made the mistake of generalizing internal and external descriptions and the operating method to Krematorien IV and V. Far from invalidating it, the discrepancies confirm its authenticity, as the descriptions are clearly based on what the witnesses could actually have seen and heard." Auschwitz scholar Robert Jan van Pelt agreed, writing in 2002: "The description of the crematoria in the War Refugee Board report contains errors, but given the conditions under which information was obtained, the lack of architectural training of Vrba and Wetzlar [sic], and the situation in which the report was compiled, one would become suspicious if it did not contain errors. ... Given the circumstances, the composite 'crematorium' reconstructed by two escapees without any architectural training is as good as one could expect."

== Impact ==
=== Background ===
The dates on which the report was distributed became a matter of importance within Holocaust historiography. Vrba alleged that lives were lost in Hungary because it was not distributed quickly enough by Jewish leaders, particularly Rudolf Kastner of the Budapest Aid and Rescue Committee. (Note: Mike Thomson (BBC, 13 November 2012): "The BBC broadcast every day, giving updates on the war, general news, and opinion pieces on Hungarian politics. But among all these broadcasts, there were crucial things that were not being said, things that might have warned thousands of Hungarian Jews of the horrors to come in the event of a German occupation. A memo setting out policy for the BBC Hungarian Service in 1942 states: 'We shouldn't mention the Jews at all.' By 1943, the BBC Polish Service was broadcasting about the exterminations. And yet, his policy of silence on the Jews was followed right up until the German invasion in March 1944. After the tanks rolled in, the Hungarian Service did then broadcast warnings.)

The Allies had been told on 12 November 1942 that Jews were being killed en masse in Auschwitz; the New York Times published a report to that effect on 25 November 1942. From March 1943, the Polish government-in-exile forwarded intelligence about what was happening inside the camp. But it remained an "inside story", according to historian Michael Fleming, unpublished or not published prominently, as a result of anti-Semitism and the British Foreign Office's refusal to confirm the reports as genuine. A document named Aneks 58 from the Polish underground (which named its report Aneks) was received by Britain's Special Operations Executive in November 1942 and noted that, by the end of 1942, 468,000 Jews had been killed at Auschwitz.

Fleming writes: "[N]ews of the true function of Auschwitz was effectively embargoed by British government policy." By issuing advice to newspaper owners and editors, by refusing to confirm Polish intelligence, and by insisting that Jews were simply citizens of the country in which they lived like any other citizen, the British government "was able to choreograph news of the Holocaust".

=== Distribution ===
Oscar Krasniansky of the Jewish Council, who translated the report into German as Vrba and Wetzler were writing and dictating it, made conflicting statements about the report after the war, according to Israeli historian Yehuda Bauer. In his first statement he said he had handed the report to Rudolf Kastner on 26 April 1944 during the latter's visit to Bratislava, but Bauer writes that the report was not finished until 27 April. In another statement, Krasniansky said he had passed it to Kastner on 28 April in Bratislava, but Hansi Brand, Kastner's lover and the wife of Joel Brand, said that Kastner was not in Bratislava until August. It is clear from Kastner's post-war statements that he did have early access to the report, Bauer writes, but perhaps not in April. According to Randolph L. Braham, Kastner had a copy by 3 May, when he paid a visit to Kolozsvár (Cluj), his home town.

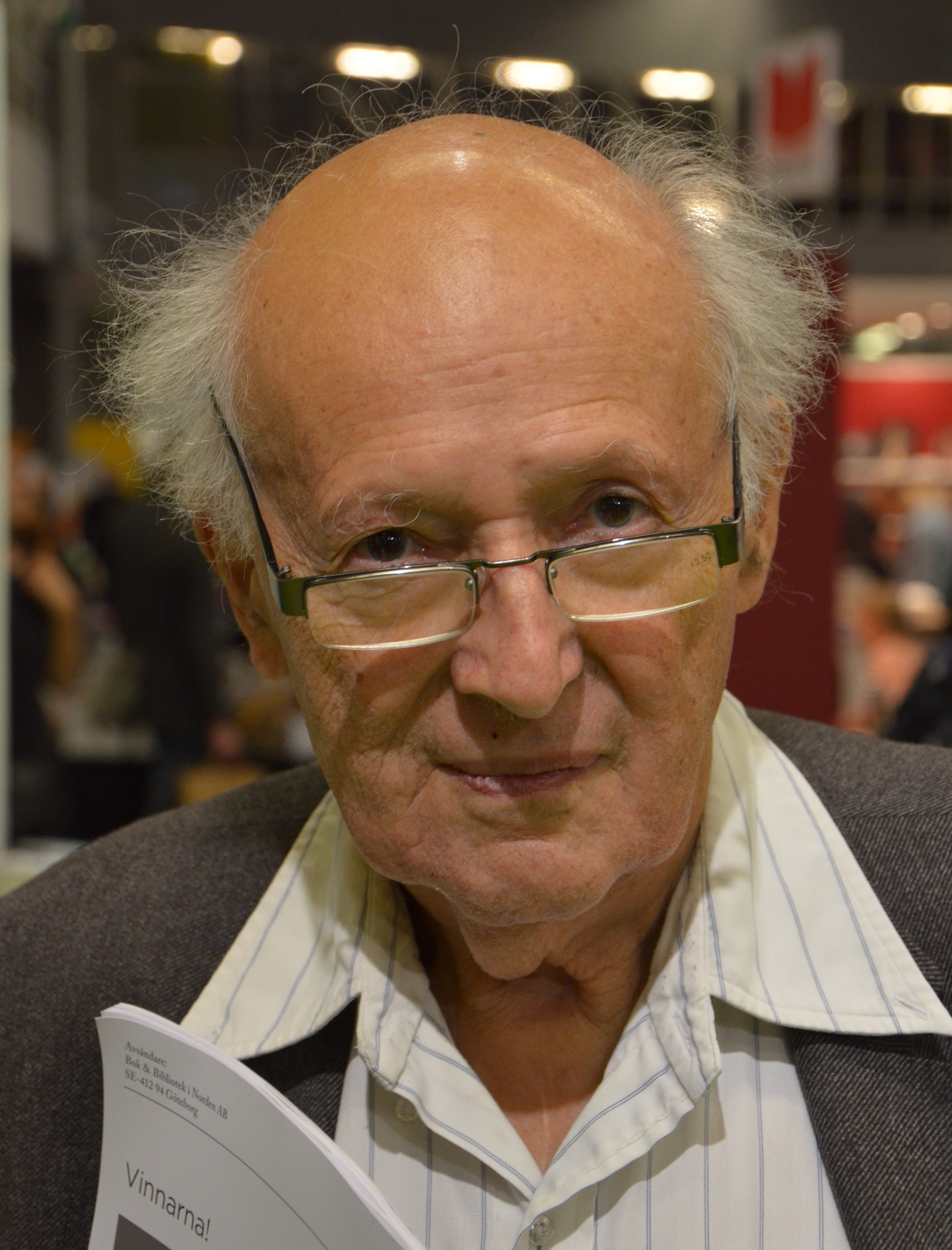
The Hungarian biologist George Klein saved his life by fleeing, rather than boarding a Holocaust train, after he read the Vrba–Wetzler report as a teenager.

Kastner's reasons for not making the document public are unknown. Vrba believed until the end of his life that Kastner withheld it in order not to jeopardize negotiations between the Aid and Rescue Committee and Adolf Eichmann, the SS officer in charge of the transport of Jews out of Hungary. Shortly after Vrba arrived in Slovakia from Auschwitz in April 1944, Eichmann proposed—to Kastner, Joel Brand and Hansi Brand in Budapest—that the Nazis trade up to one million Hungarian Jews for 10,000 trucks and other goods from the Western Allies. The proposal came to nothing, but Kastner did obtain safe passage to Switzerland for 1,684 Jews on what became known as the Kastner train. Vrba believed that Kastner suppressed the Vrba–Wetzler report in order not to damage these negotiations.

Kastner copied the German translation of the report to Géza Soós, a Hungarian Foreign Ministry official who ran a resistance group, writes Bauer. Soós gave it to József Éliás, head of the Good Shepherd Mission, and Éliás's secretary, Mária Székely, translated it into Hungarian and prepared six copies. These copies made their way to several Hungarian and church officials, including Miklós Horthy's daughter-in-law. Braham writes that this distribution occurred before 15 May. According to Bauer, Ernő Pető, a member of the Budapest Jewish Council, said he gave copies to Horthy's son; the papal nuncio Angelo Rotta; and the finance minister Lajos Reményi-Schneller.

The Jewish Council in Budapest did hand the report out to individuals. The Hungarian biologist George Klein, as a teenager in Budapest, was working for the Jewish Council as a junior secretary at the time. One day in late May or early June, his boss, Dr. Zoltán Kohn, gave him a carbon copy of the report, and told him that he should tell only his closest family and friends about it. Klein told his uncle, a well-known physician, who "became so angry that he nearly hit me", and asked how he could believe such nonsense. It was the same with other relatives and friends. The older ones refused to believe it, while the younger ones believed it and wanted to act. When it came time for Klein to get on the train, he chose to run instead, and that saved his life.

According to Gábor Havas, a member of the Hungarian resistance, Soos had also prepared English translations. In December, Soos made a daring escape in a stolen German airplane to help the report reach Allied lines, not knowing that it already happened. Curiously, OSS records of Soos's interrogation that have been made public do not mention the report. According to Soos's wife, Raoul Wallenberg was also trying to transport a copy to the interim Hungarian government in Debrecen when he disappeared.

According to the USHMM (United States Holocaust Museum) the US War Refugee Board released the report after an unusually long delay. "In November 1944, the WRB released a report written by escapees from the Auschwitz-Birkenau camp, alerting Americans to the details of Nazi mass murder using gas chambers."

=== Deportations to Auschwitz continue ===
On 6 June 1944, the day of the Normandy landings, Arnošt Rosin and Czesław Mordowicz arrived in Slovakia, having escaped from Auschwitz on 27 May. Hearing about the Battle of Normandy and believing the war was over, they got drunk using dollars they had smuggled out of Auschwitz. As a result they were arrested for violating the currency laws, and spent time in jail before the Jewish Council paid their fines. On 15 June, the men were interviewed by Oscar Krasniansky. They told him that, between 15 and 27 May, 100,000 Hungarian Jews had arrived at Birkenau, and that most were killed on arrival, apparently with no knowledge of what was about to happen to them. John Conway writes that Vrba and Wetzler concluded that their report had been suppressed.

=== Report's arrival in Switzerland, press coverage ===
Braham writes that the report was taken to Switzerland by Florian Manoliu of the Romanian Legation in Bern, and given to George Mantello, a Jewish businessman from Transylvania who was working as the first secretary of the El Salvador consulate in Geneva. It was thanks to Mantello, according to Braham, that the report received, in the Swiss press, its first wide coverage. According to David Kranzler, Mantello asked for the help of the Swiss-Hungarian Students' League to make around 50 mimeographed copies of the Vrba–Wetzler and other Auschwitz reports (the Auschwitz Protocols), which by 23 June he had distributed to the Swiss government and Jewish groups. The students went on to make thousands of other copies, which were passed to other students and MPs.

As a result of the Swiss press coverage, details were published in The New York Times on 4 June 1944 while World War II was still in progress. Details were disseminated by the BBC World Service on 15 June, with a second report in The New York Times on 20 June, which carried a 22-line story that 7,000 Jews had been "dragged to gas chambers in the notorious German concentration camps at Birkenau and Oświęcim [Auschwitz]".

On 19 June 1944, Richard Lichtheim of the Jewish Agency in Geneva, who had received a copy of the report from Mantello, wrote to the Jewish Agency in Jerusalem to say that they knew "what has happened and where it has happened", and reported the Vrba–Wetzler figure that 90 percent of Jews arriving at Birkenau were being killed. (Note: Kranzler places the cable to Jerusalem on 26 June 1944, and writes that Lichtheim referred in the cable to 12,000 Jews being deported daily from Budapest.) Vrba and Oscar Krasniansky met Vatican Swiss legate Monsignor Mario Martilotti at the Svätý Jur monastery in Bratislava on 20 June. Martilotti had seen the report and questioned Vrba about it for six hours. According to Bauer, Martilotti said he was travelling to Switzerland the next day. On 25 June Pope Pius sent a public cable to Horthy, asking that he "do everything in ...[his] power to save as many unfortunate people from further pain and sorrow". Other world leaders followed suit. Daniel Brigham, New York Times correspondent in Geneva, published a longer story on 3 July, "Inquiry Confirms Nazi Death Camps", and on 6 July a second, "Two Death Camps Places of Horror; German Establishments for Mass Killings of Jews Described by Swiss".

=== Deportations halted ===
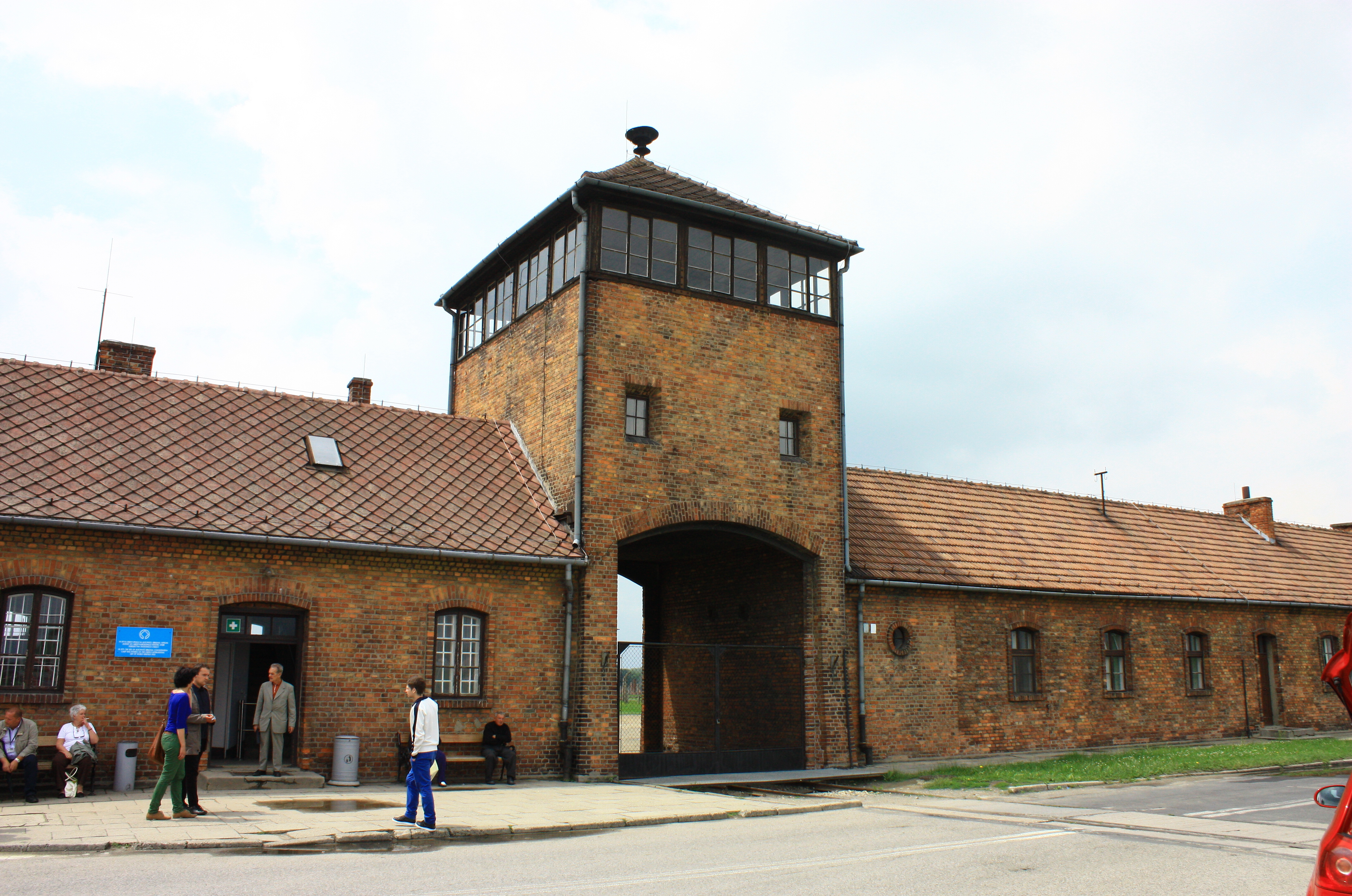
Auschwitz II-Birkenau in 2012

On 26 June, Richard Lichtheim of the Jewish Agency in Geneva sent a telegram to England calling on the Allies to hold members of the Hungarian government personally responsible for the killings. The cable was intercepted by the Hungarian government and shown to Prime Minister Döme Sztójay, who passed it to Horthy. Horthy ordered an end to the deportations on 7 July, and they stopped two days later.

Hitler instructed the Nazi representative to Hungary, Edmund Veesenmayer, to relay an angry message to Horthy. Horthy resisted Hitler's threats, and Budapest's 200,000–260,000 Jews were temporarily spared from deportation, until the pro-Nazi Arrow Cross Party seized power in Hungary in a coup on 15 October 1944. Henceforth, the deportations resumed, but by then, the diplomatic involvement of the Swedish, Swiss, Spanish, and Portuguese embassies in Budapest, as well as that of the papal nuncio, Angelo Rotta, saved tens of thousands until the arrival of the Red Army in Budapest in January 1945. Swiss diplomat Carl Lutz rescued tens of thousands of Jews (according to the Yad Vashem museum display, in the order of 50,000) with help of Moshe Krausz (then Director of the Jewish Agency's Palestine Office in Budapest) and the Zionist Youth Underground. Raoul Wallenberg and others in the Swedish delegation also saved tens of thousands of Jews (according to some, between 70,000 and 100,000). As can be expected, there are varying estimates of the number of Jews rescued.

== See also ==
- Karski's reports
- Witold's Report
- Raczyński's Note
- The Auschwitz Report – 2021 drama film about the escape
- Bibliography of the Holocaust § Primary sources

== Works cited ==
- Bauer, Yehuda (1994). Jews for Sale? Nazi–Jewish Negotiations 1933–1945. New Haven: Yale University Press.
- _________ (2002). Rethinking the Holocaust. Yale University Press.
- Braham, Randolph L. (2000). The Politics of Genocide: The Holocaust in Hungary. Wayne State University Press; first published in 1981 in two volumes.
- _________ (2011). "Hungary: The Controversial Chapter of the Holocaust", in Randolph L. Braham and William vanden Heuvel (ed.). The Auschwitz Reports and the Holocaust in Hungary. New York: Columbia University Press.
- Conway, John (2002). "The Significance of the Vrba-Wetzler Report on Auschwitz-Birkenau", in Vrba, Rudolf. I escaped from Auschwitz. Barricade Books.
- _________ (1997). "The First Report about Auschwitz", Museum of Tolerance, Simon Wiesenthal Center, Annual 1, Chapter 7.
- Dwork, Debórah and Van Pelt, Robert Jan (2002). Holocaust: A History. W.W. Norton & Company.
- Fleming, Michael. (2014a). "Allied Knowledge of Auschwitz: A (Further) Challenge to the 'Elusiveness' Narrative". Holocaust and Genocide Studies, 28 (1), 1 April, 31–57. doi:10.1093/hgs/dcu014
- Fleming, Michael (2014b). Auschwitz, the Allies and Censorship of the Holocaust. Cambridge: Cambridge University Press.
- Gilbert, Martin (1989). "The Question of Bombing Auschwitz", in Michael Robert Marrus (ed.). The Nazi Holocaust: The End of the Holocaust. Part 9. Walter de Gruyter.
- Hilberg, Raul (2003). The Destruction of the European Jews. Yale University Press; first published 1961.
- Kárný, Miroslav (1998). "The Vrba and Wetzler report", in Berenbaum and Gutman, op. cit.
- Klein, George (2011). "Confronting the Holocaust: An Eyewitness Account", in Braham and vanden Heuvel, op. cit.
- Kranzler, David (2000). The Man Who Stopped the Trains to Auschwitz: George Mantello, El Salvador, and Switzerland's Finest Hour. Syracuse University Press.
- Lévai, Jenö (1987). Eichmann in Hungary: Documents. Howard Fertig.
- Phayer, Michael (2000). The Catholic Church and the Holocaust, 1930-1965, Bloomington: Indiana University Press.
- Pressac, Jean-Claude (1989). Auschwitz: Technique and operation of the gas chambers. The Beate Klarsfeld Foundation.
- Rees, Laurence (2006). Auschwitz: A New History. PublicAffairs.
- Świebocki, Henryk (ed.) (1997). London has been informed. Reports by Auschwitz Escapees. Auschwitz-Birkenau State Museum.
- Szabó, Zoltán Tibori (2011). "The Auschwitz Reports: Who Got Them, and When?" in Randolph L. Braham and William vanden Heuvel. The Auschwitz Reports and the Holocaust in Hungary. Columbia University Press.
- van Pelt, Robert Jan (2002). The Case for Auschwitz: Evidence from the Irving Trial. Bloomington: Indiana University Press.
- _________ (2011). "When the Veil was Rent in Twain", in Randolph L. Braham and William vanden Heuvel op. cit.
- Vrba, Rudolf (2002). I Escaped from Auschwitz. Barricade Books, 2002. First published as I Cannot Forgive by Sidgwick and Jackson, Grove Press, 1963 (also published as Escape from Auschwitz).
