= Joel Brand =

Rescue worker

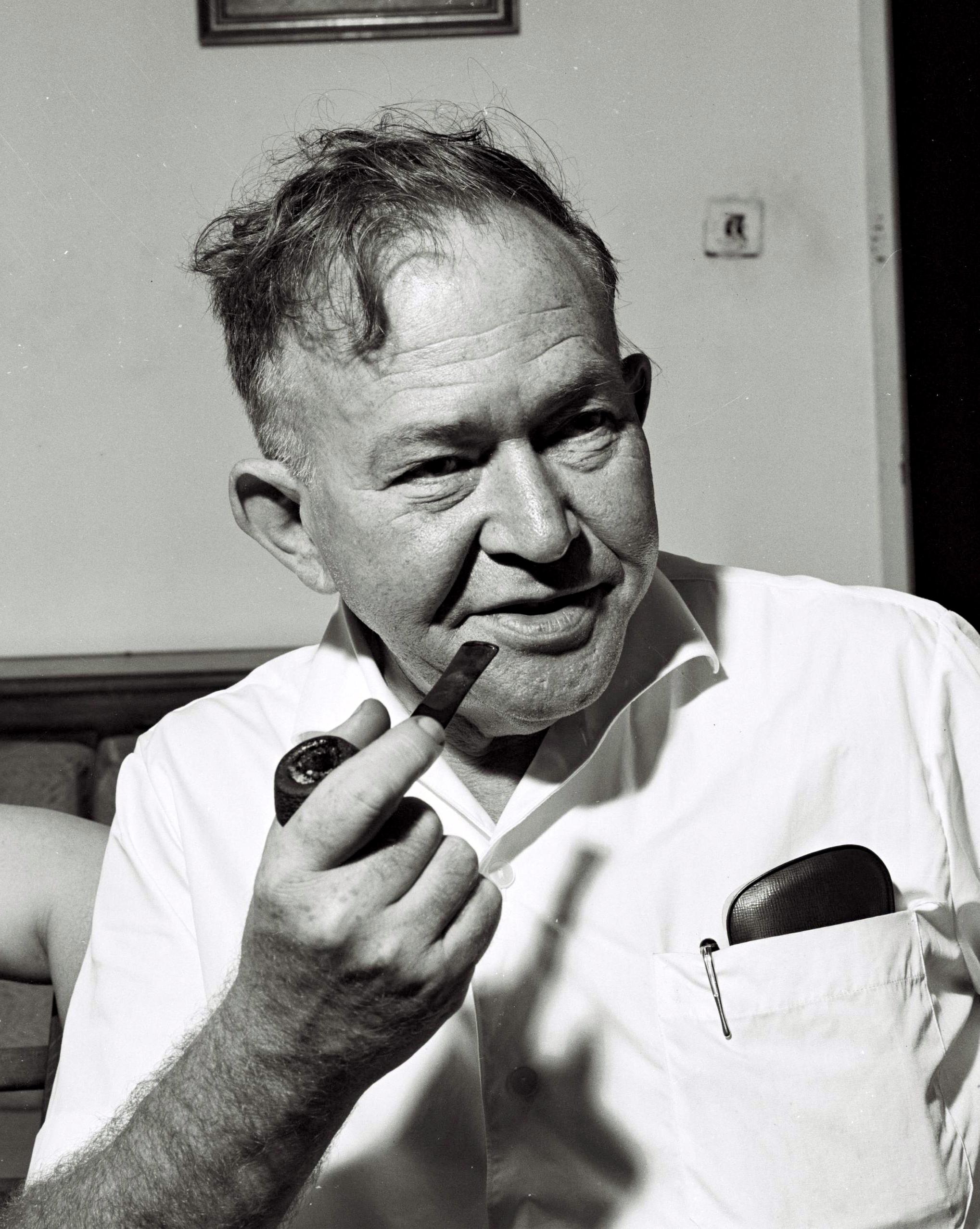
- Brand in 1961
- Born: 25 April 1906; Naszód, Austria-Hungary
- Died: 13 July 1964 (aged 58); Bad Kissingen, West Germany
- Resting place: Tel Aviv, Israel
- Known for: "Blood for goods" proposal
- Spouse: Haynalka "Hansi" Brand (née Hartmann)

Joel Brand (Hungarian: Brand Jenő; 25 April 1906 – 13 July 1964) was a member of the Budapest Aid and Rescue Committee (Va'adat ha-Ezra ve-ha-Hatzala be-Budapest or Va'ada), an underground Zionist group in Budapest, Hungary, that smuggled Jews out of German-occupied Europe to the relative safety of Hungary, during the Holocaust. When Germany invaded Hungary in March 1944, Brand became known for his efforts to save the Jewish community from deportation to the Auschwitz concentration camp in occupied Poland and the gas chambers there.

In April 1944 Brand was approached by SS-Obersturmbannführer Adolf Eichmann, head of the German Reich Security Head Office department IV B4 (Jewish affairs), who had arrived in Budapest to organize the deportations. Eichmann proposed that Brand broker a deal between the SS and the United States or Britain, in which the Nazis would exchange one million Jews for 10,000 trucks for the Eastern front and large quantities of tea and other goods. It was the most ambitious of a series of proposals between the SS and Jewish leaders. Eichmann called it "Blut gegen Waren" ("blood for goods").

Nothing came of the idea, which The Times of London called one of the most loathsome stories of the war. (Note: The Times, 20 July 1944: "It has long been clear that, faced with the certainty of defeat, the German authorities would intensify all their efforts to blackmail, deceive and split the allies. In their latest effort, made known in London yesterday, they have reached a new level of fantasy and self-deception. They have put forward, or sponsored, an offer to exchange the remaining Hungarian Jews for munitions of war—which, they said, would not be used on the Western front. "The whole story is one of the most loathsome of the war. It begins with a process of deliberate extirpation and ends, to date, with attempted blackmail. ... The British Government know what value to set on any German or German-sponsored offer ... they know, as well as the Germans, what happens when one begins paying blackmail. The blackmailer increases his price. Such considerations provided their own answer to the proposed bargain.") Historians have suggested that the SS, including its commander, Reichsführer-SS Heinrich Himmler, intended the negotiations as cover for peace talks with the Western Allies that would have excluded the Soviet Union and perhaps even Adolf Hitler. Whatever its purpose, the proposal was thwarted by the British government. They arrested Brand in Aleppo (then under British control), where he had gone to propose Eichmann's offer to the Jewish Agency, and put an end to it by leaking details to the media.

The failure of the proposal, and the wider issue of why the Allies were unable to save the 437,000 Hungarian Jews deported to Auschwitz between May and July 1944, became the subject of bitter debate for many years. In 1961 Life magazine called Brand "a man who lives in the shadows with a broken heart". He told an interviewer shortly before his death in 1964: "An accident of life placed the fate of one million human beings on my shoulders. I eat and sleep and think only of them."

== Background ==
=== Early life ===
German-occupied Europe, 1942

One of seven children, Brand was born to a Jewish family in Naszód, Transylvania, Austria-Hungary (today Năsăud, Romania). His father was the founder of the Budapest telephone company, and his paternal grandfather, also Joel Brand, had owned the post office in Munkács (now Mukachevo, Ukraine).

The family moved to Erfurt in Germany when Brand was four. When he was 19 he went to stay with an uncle in New York, then worked his way across the United States, washing dishes and working on roads and in mines. He joined the Communist Party, worked for the Comintern as a sailor, and sailed to Hawaii, the Philippines, South America, China, and Japan.

In or around 1930 Brand returned to Erfurt, where he worked for another telephone company his father had founded and became a functionary with the Thuringian KPD (Communist Party of Germany). He was still living in Germany when Adolf Hitler was sworn in as Chancellor on 30 January 1933, and on 27 February that year he was arrested, as a communist, just before the Reichstag fire. Released in 1934, he moved to Budapest, Hungary, where he worked again for his father's company. He joined the Poale Zion, a Marxist-Zionist party, became a vice-president of the Budapest Palestine Office, which organized Jewish emigration to Palestine, and sat on the governing body of the Jewish National Fund.

=== Aid and Rescue Committee ===
Oskar Schindler and Hansi Brand, mid-1960s

In 1935 Brand married Haynalka "Hansi" Hartmann and together they opened a knitwear and glove factory on Rozsa Street, Budapest, which after a few years had a staff of over 100. The couple had met as members of a hachscharah, a group of Jews preparing to move to Palestine to work on a kibbutz, but Brand's plans changed when his mother and three sisters fled to Budapest from Germany and he had to support them.

Brand's involvement in smuggling Jews into Hungary began in July 1941, when Hansi Brand's sister and brother-in-law, Lajos Stern, were caught up in the Kamianets-Podilskyi massacre. Because of the situation in Austria, Czechoslovakia and Poland, 15,000–35,000 Jews had fled to Hungary, registering with the National Central Alien Control Office. The Hungarian government expelled 18,000 of this group to German-occupied Ukraine, where on 27–28 August 1941, the SS and Ukrainian collaborators shot 14,000–16,000 of them. About 2,000 survived. Brand paid a Hungarian counter-espionage officer to bring his wife's relatives back safely. The Hungarian Interior Minister was reportedly shocked when he learned about the massacre, and the deportations were halted.

Through the Poale Zion party, the Brands joined other Zionists engaged in rescue work, including Rezső Kasztner, a lawyer and journalist from Kolozsvár (Cluj, Transylvania), and Ottó Komoly, an engineer. In January 1943 the group set up the Aid and Rescue Committee, known as the Va'adat Ha-Ezrah ve'Hatzalah or Va'ada, with Komoly as chair. Other members included Andreas Biss (Brand's cousin), Samuel Springmann (a Polish jeweller whose family were in the Łódź Ghetto), Sandor Offenbach, Dr. Miklos Schweiziger, Moshe Krausz, Eugen Frankel, and Ernő Szilágyi from the Hashomer Hatzair party. The Va'ada raised money, forged documents, maintained contacts with intelligence agencies, and ran safe houses. Brand testified during Adolf Eichmann's trial that, between 1941 and the German invasion of Hungary in March 1944, he and the committee had helped 22,000–25,000 Jews reach Hungary.

Oskar Schindler became one of the committee's contacts, smuggling letters and money into the Kraków Ghetto on their behalf. During a visit by Schindler to Budapest in November 1943, they learned that Schindler had been bribing Nazi officers to let him bring Jewish refugees into his factory in Poland, which he ran as a safe haven. This further encouraged the committee, after the invasion of Hungary, to try negotiating with the SS.

== March–May 1944 ==
=== Invasion of Hungary ===
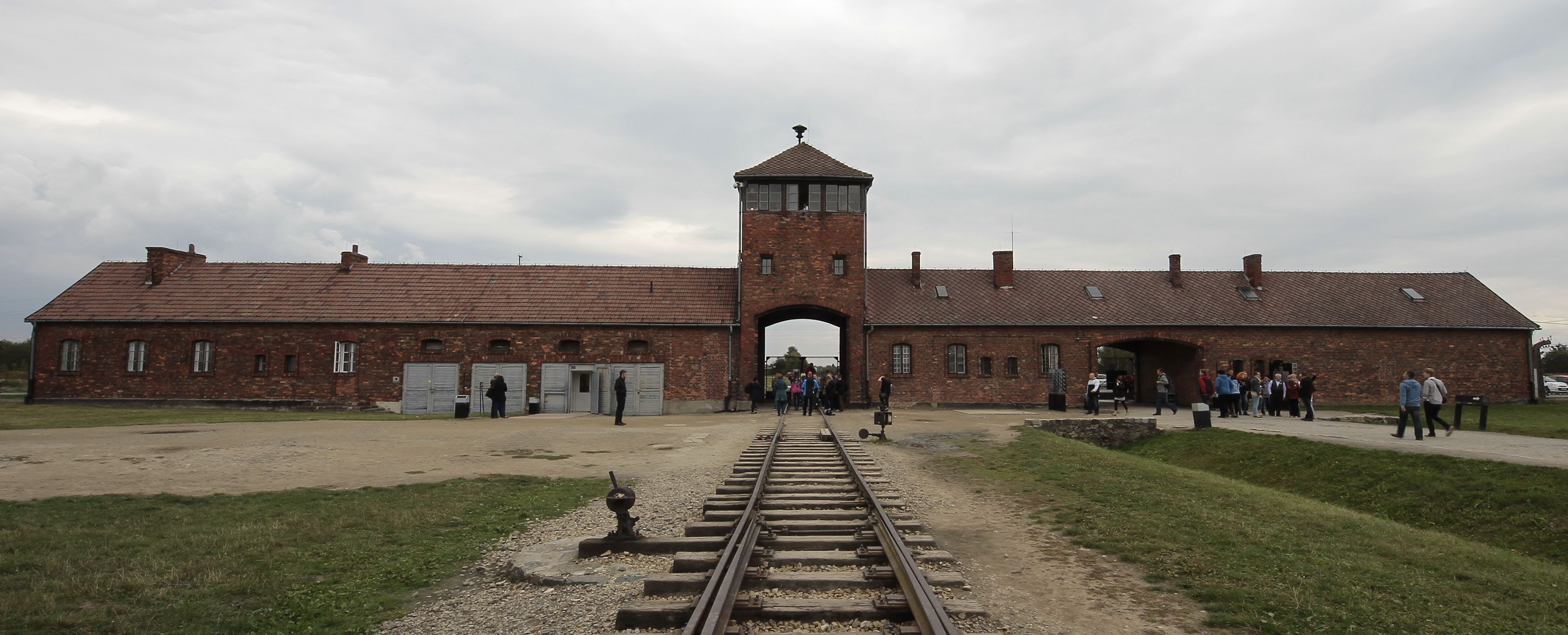
Auschwitz II gatehouse from inside the camp. The tracks were completed in 1944 to take the Hungarian Jews straight to the gas chambers in crematoria II and III.

When the Germans invaded Hungary on Sunday, 19 March 1944, they were accompanied by a Sonderkommando led by SS-Obersturmbannführer Adolf Eichmann, head of the Reich Security Head Office department IV B4 (Jewish affairs). Eichmann's arrival in Budapest signalled the Germans' intention to "solve" Hungary's Jewish question. Following Hungary's annexation in 1941 of parts of Romania, Yugoslavia and Czechoslovakia, there were 725,000 Jews in the country, as well as over 60,000 Jewish converts to Christianity and others the Nazis counted as Jews, according to Yehuda Bauer. Most were liberal Jews and fully assimilated, nearly 30 percent were Orthodox, and a small minority were Zionists.

Randolph Braham writes that Jews were viewed with suspicion in Hungary as advocates for democracy, liberalism, socialism and communism. Restrictions had been in place before the invasion, including a prohibition on marrying Christians; according to the United States Holocaust Memorial Museum, the Hungarian Parliament passed 22 antisemitic laws between May 1938 and March 1944. The Jewish leadership in Hungary was aware of the mass murder of Jews in occupied Europe, but the rest of the Jewish community was not, in Braham's view; he writes that the leadership's failure to inform the community and to plan for Hungary's occupation is "one of the great tragedies of the era". (Note: Braham (The Politics of Genocide: The Holocaust in Hungary, 2016): "The Hungarian Jewish leaders were aware of what the Nazis had wrought in the Jewish communities under their control. The mass exterminations by the Einsatzgruppen in Soviet territories ... and the assembly-line murders in the German concentration camps of Jews deported from all over Europe were known to them. ... Nevertheless, and this is one of the great tragedies of the era, they neither kept the Jewish masses fully informed nor did they take any meaningful precautionary measures to forestall or minimize the catastrophe in the event of an occupation of Hungary.")

After the invasion, the Hungarian government began isolating Jews from the rest of the community. From 5 April 1944 Jews over the age of six had to wear a 10-by-10-centimetre (4 in × 4 in) yellow badge. Jews were forbidden from using telephones, owning cars or radios, travelling or moving home, and had to declare the value of their property. Jewish civil servants, journalists and lawyers were sacked, and non-Jews could not work in Jewish households. Books by Jews or Christians with Jewish heritage were removed from libraries, and Jewish authors could no longer be published.

=== Meeting with Wisliceny ===
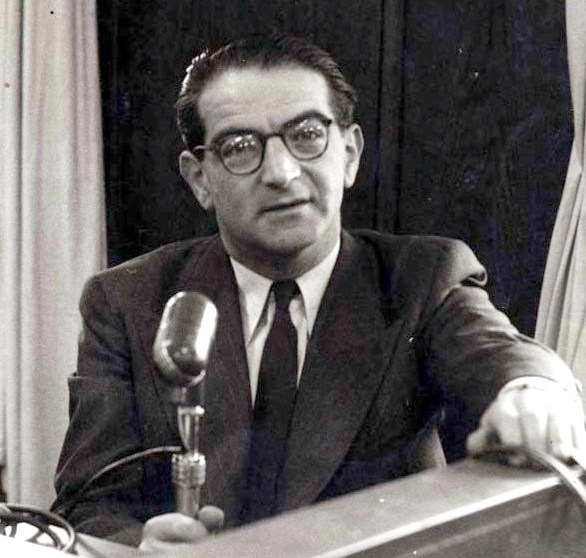
Rezső Kasztner

On the day of the invasion, Kasztner and Szilágyi hid in the apartment of Andreas Biss, a chemical engineer, in Semsey Street, Budapest. They were later joined by Komoly and his wife, and the Brands and their two children. Wanting to establish contact with the Germans, the committee offered a go-between $20,000 to arrange a meeting with SS Hauptsturmführer Dieter Wisliceny, one of Eichmann's assistants.

David Crowe writes that the SS had become an economic force in its own right by 1944, as a result its plundering of Jewish businesses and its ownership of factories relying on slave labour from concentration camps. Jewish rescue workers had made several attempts to exploit SS corruption. In Bratislava, Slovakia, Gisi Fleischmann and Orthodox Rabbi Michael Dov Weissmandl, leaders of the Working Group (a group within the Slovak Jewish Council that served as the equivalent of the Aid and Rescue Committee), had paid Dieter Wisliceny c. $50,000 in 1942 to suspend the deportation to Poland of Jews from Slovakia. According to Bauer, only two transports left for Poland after Wisliceny was paid, and the Working Group believed their bribe had succeeded.

In fact, the deportations had been halted for other reasons: Slovak officials had been bribed; many Jews were protected by government documents showing they were, for example, essential workers; and there had been an intervention from the Vatican in June 1942. Encouraged by their apparent success, Fleischmann and Weissmandl devised a more ambitious proposal in November 1942. Known as the Europa Plan or Grossplan, the aim was to bribe the SS with money from Jews overseas, primarily the United States, to stop the deportation of all Jews to Poland. Nothing came of the proposal, reportedly because Heinrich Himmler intervened to stop it in August 1943.

The Aid and Rescue Committee decided to ask Wisliceny whether the SS were, as Kasztner wrote in a later report, "prepared to negotiate with the illegal Jewish rescue committee on an economic basis about the moderation of the anti-Jewish measures". Brand and Kasztner met Wisliceny on 5 April 1944. They told him they were in a position to continue Fleischmann's negotiations and could offer $2 million, with a down payment of $200,000. They asked that there be no deportations, mass executions or pogroms in Hungary, no ghettos or camps, and that Jews who held immigration certificates for Palestine (issued by the British mandatory government) be allowed to leave. Wisliceny accepted the $200,000, but indicated that $2 million might not be enough. He said there would be no deportations and no harm to the Jewish community while negotiations continued, and arranged for Aid and Rescue Committee exemptions from anti-Jewish laws to allow its members to travel and use cars and telephones.

=== First meeting with Eichmann ===
Adolf Eichmann, c. 1942. "Eichmann, resplendent in his SS uniform, stood in front of his desk and started barking at Brand: 'You ... do you know who I am?"

Following the contact with Wisliceny, Brand received a message on 25 April that Eichmann wanted to see him. Brand was told to wait in the Opera Café and from there was driven by the SS to Eichmann's headquarters at the Hotel Majestic. SS Untersturmbannführer Kurt Becher, an emissary of Reichsführer-SS Heinrich Himmler, was also at the meeting. Brand wrote that Eichmann wore a "well-cut" uniform and had eyes he would never forget: "Steely blue, hard and sharp, they seemed to bore through you. ... It was only later that I noticed his small face with its thin lips and sharp nose." In a tone that Brand compared to the "clatter of a machine gun", Eichmann offered to sell him one million Jews, not for money, but for goods from overseas:

I have already made investigations about you and your people and I have verified your ability to make a deal. Now then, I am prepared to sell you one million Jews ... Goods for blood – blood for goods. You can take them from any country you like, wherever you can find them – Hungary, Poland, the Ostmark, from Theresienstadt, from Auschwitz, wherever you like.

Eichmann said he would discuss the proposal with Berlin, and that in the meantime Brand should decide what kinds of goods he was in a position to offer. When Brand asked how the committee was supposed to obtain these goods, Eichmann suggested that Brand open negotiations with the Allies overseas; Eichmann said he would arrange a travel permit. Another member of the Va'ada had a Jewish Agency contact in Istanbul, so Brand suggested he would travel there. He testified years later that on leaving the hotel he felt like a "stark madman".

=== Further meetings ===
Eichmann sent for Brand again a few days later. Eichmann was accompanied this time by Gerhard Clages, also known as Otto Klages, chief of Himmler's Sicherheitsdienst (security service) in Budapest. Clages' presence meant that three of Himmler's senior officers – Eichmann, Becher and Clages – had involved themselves with the Brand proposal. Clages handed Brand $50,000 and 270,000 Swiss francs that the Germans had intercepted, sent to the Aid and Rescue Committee by rescue workers in Switzerland via the Swedish Embassy in Budapest.

Eichmann told Brand that he wanted 10,000 new trucks for the Waffen-SS to use on the Eastern front or for civilian purposes, as well as 200 tons of tea, 800 tons of coffee, 2,000,000 cases of soap, and a quantity of tungsten and other materials. If Brand returned from Istanbul with confirmation that the Allies had accepted the proposal, Eichmann said he would release 10 percent of the one million. The deal would proceed with 100,000 Jews released for every 1,000 trucks.

== May–October 1944 ==
=== Mass deportations begin ===
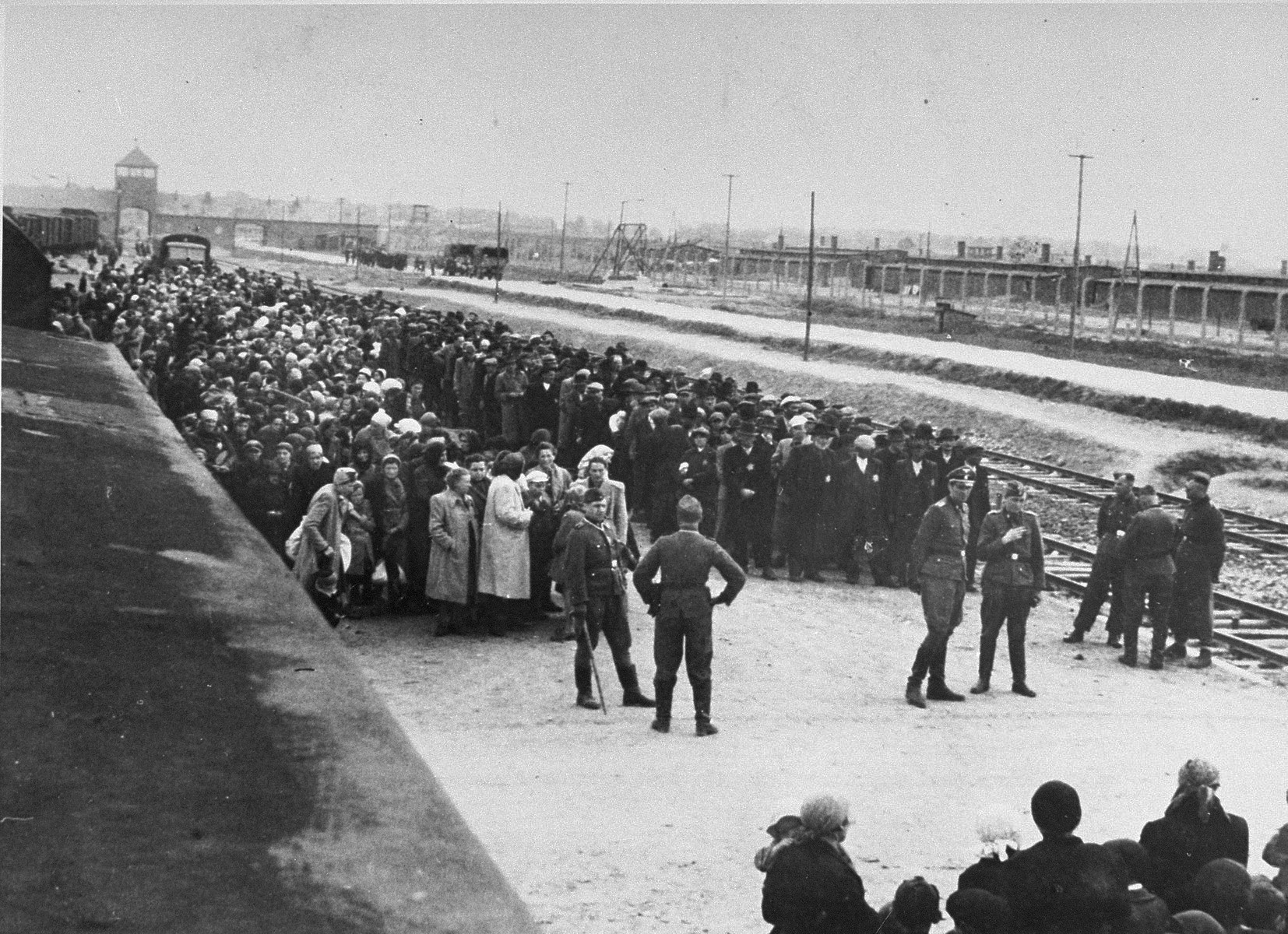
Jews arriving at Auschwitz II from Hungary, c. May 1944. Most were sent straight to the gas chamber.

It remains unclear whether Eichmann told Brand to return to Budapest by a particular date. According to Bauer, Brand said at various points that he was given one, two or three weeks or was advised that he could "take [his] time". Hansi Brand testified during Eichmann's trial in 1961 that she and her children had to remain in Budapest, effectively as hostages. Brand and Eichmann met again, for the last time on 15 May, the day the mass deportations to Auschwitz began. Between then and 9 July 1944, around 437,000 Jews, almost the entire Jewish population of the Hungarian countryside, were deported to Auschwitz on 147 trains. Most were gassed on arrival. (Note: Telegram from Edmund Veesenmayer, the Reich plenipotentiary in Hungary, 11 July 1944: "Supplement to telegram 1838 dated June 30.I. The concentration and transporting of Jews in Zone V, including the Budapest-suburb raid on July 9 and involving 55,741 Jews, has been completed as planned. The aggregate result of Zones I–V and the suburban raid has now risen to 437,402." "In his report dated July 9, Lieutenant Colonel of the Hungarian gendarmerie Laszlo Ferenczy, acting as liaison officer between the Hungarian Ministry of the Interior and the Sondereinsatzkommando, talks about 434,351 'individuals of the Jewish race' deported on 147 trains between May 14 – July 9." Apparently 15,000 were sent to a camp other than Auschwitz.)

=== Brand leaves for Istanbul ===
Brand secured a letter of recommendation for the Jewish Agency from the Hungarian Jewish Council. He was told he would be travelling with Bandi Grosz (real name, Andor Gross), a Hungarian who had worked for Hungarian and German military intelligence; Grosz would travel to Istanbul as the director of a Hungarian transport company. The SS drove the men from Budapest to Vienna on 17 May, where they stayed the night in a hotel reserved for the SS. Grosz later testified that Brand's mission had been a cover for his own. He said he had been told by Clages to arrange a meeting in a neutral country between senior German and American officers, or British if necessary, to broker peace between the German Sicherheitsdienst and the Western Allies.

=== Meeting with Jewish Agency ===
In Vienna, Brand was given a German passport in the name of Eugen Band. He cabled the Jewish Agency in Istanbul to say he was on his way, and arrived by German diplomatic plane on 19 May. Paul Rose writes that Brand had no idea at this point that the deportations to Auschwitz had already begun.

Brand had been told by the Jewish Agency by return cable that "Chaim" would meet him in Istanbul. Convinced of the importance of his mission, he believed this was Chaim Weizmann, president of the World Zionist Organization, later the first president of Israel. In fact the man who had arranged to meet him was Chaim Barlas, head of the Istanbul group of Zionist emissaries. Furthermore, not only was Barlas not there, but there was no entry visa waiting for Brand, and he was threatened with arrest and deportation. Brand saw this as the first betrayal by the Jewish Agency. Bauer argues that Brand, then and later, failed to grasp that the Jewish Agency was powerless. That his passport was in the name of Eugen Band would have been enough to cause the confusion.

The visa situation was sorted out by Bandi Grosz and the men were taken to a hotel, where they met the Jewish Agency delegates. Brand was furious that no one sufficiently senior was available to negotiate a deal. The Jewish Agency agreed to arrange for Moshe Sharett, head of its political department and later second prime minister of Israel, to travel to Istanbul to meet him. Brand passed them a plan of Auschwitz (probably from the Vrba-Wetzler report) and demanded that the gas chambers, crematoria and railway lines be bombed. The discussions left him discouraged and depressed. He wrote that the delegates lacked any sense of urgency and were focused more on internal politics and Jewish emigration to Palestine, rather than the slaughter in Europe: "[They] were undoubtedly worthy men ... But they lacked any awareness of how critical was the period of history in which they were living. They had not looked death in the face day after day, as we had in Budapest ..."

=== Interim agreement ===
Ladislaus Löb writes that proposals and counter-proposals flew between Istanbul, London and Washington. The Jewish Agency and Brand wanted the Allies to string the Germans along in the hope of slowing the deportations. The Agency gave Brand a document, dated 29 May 1944, that offered $400,000 for every 1,000 Jewish emigrants to Palestine, one million Swiss francs per 10,000 Jewish emigrants to neutral countries such as Spain, and 10,000 Swiss francs a month if the deportations were to stop. If the SS would allow the Allies to supply food, clothes and medicine to the Jews in concentration camps, the Nazis would be supplied with the same. Rose writes that the agreement was intended only to give Brand something to take back to Budapest.

Brand cabled his wife on 29 and 31 May to tell her (and thereby Eichmann) about the agreement, but there was no response. Rezső Kasztner and Hansi Brand had been held in Budapest between 27 May and 1 June by the Hungarian Arrow Cross. They received the telegrams when they were released, but Eichmann refused to halt the deportations.

=== Arrest by British Authorities ===
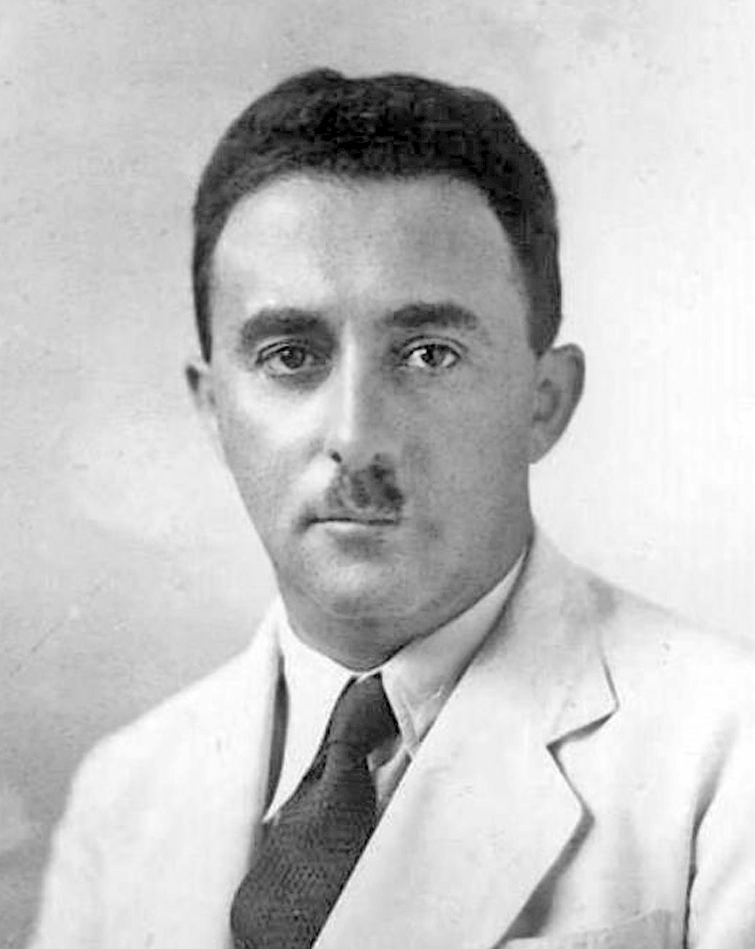
Moshe Sharett, head of the Jewish Agency's political department; second prime minister of Israel 1954–1955

In Istanbul, Brand was told that Moshe Sharett was unable to obtain a visa for Turkey. The Jewish Agency asked Brand to meet Sharett instead in Aleppo on the Syrian-Turkish border. He was reluctant; the area was under British control and he was afraid they would want to question him, but the Agency told him it would be safe and he left by train with two of its delegates.

While on the train, Brand was approached by two representatives of Zeev Jabotinsky's Hatzohar (Revisionist Zionist) party and the World Agudath Israel Orthodox religious party. They told him the British were going to arrest him in Aleppo: "Die Engländer sind in dieser Frage nicht unsere Verbündeten" ("the British are not our allies in this matter"). As soon as he arrived at the Aleppo train station on 7 June, he was stopped by a British man in plain clothes and pushed into a Jeep that was waiting with its engine running.

The British drove him to a villa, where for four days they tried to stop Moshe Sharett from meeting him. Sharett "fought a battle of telephones and cables," Bauer writes, and on 11 June he and the Jewish Agency intelligence group were finally introduced to Brand. The discussion lasted several hours. Sharett wrote in a report of 27 June: "I must have looked a little incredulous, for he said: 'Please believe me: they have killed six million Jews; there are only two million left alive.'" At the end of the meeting, Sharett broke the news that the British were insisting Brand not return to Budapest. Brand became hysterical.

=== Proposal rejected ===
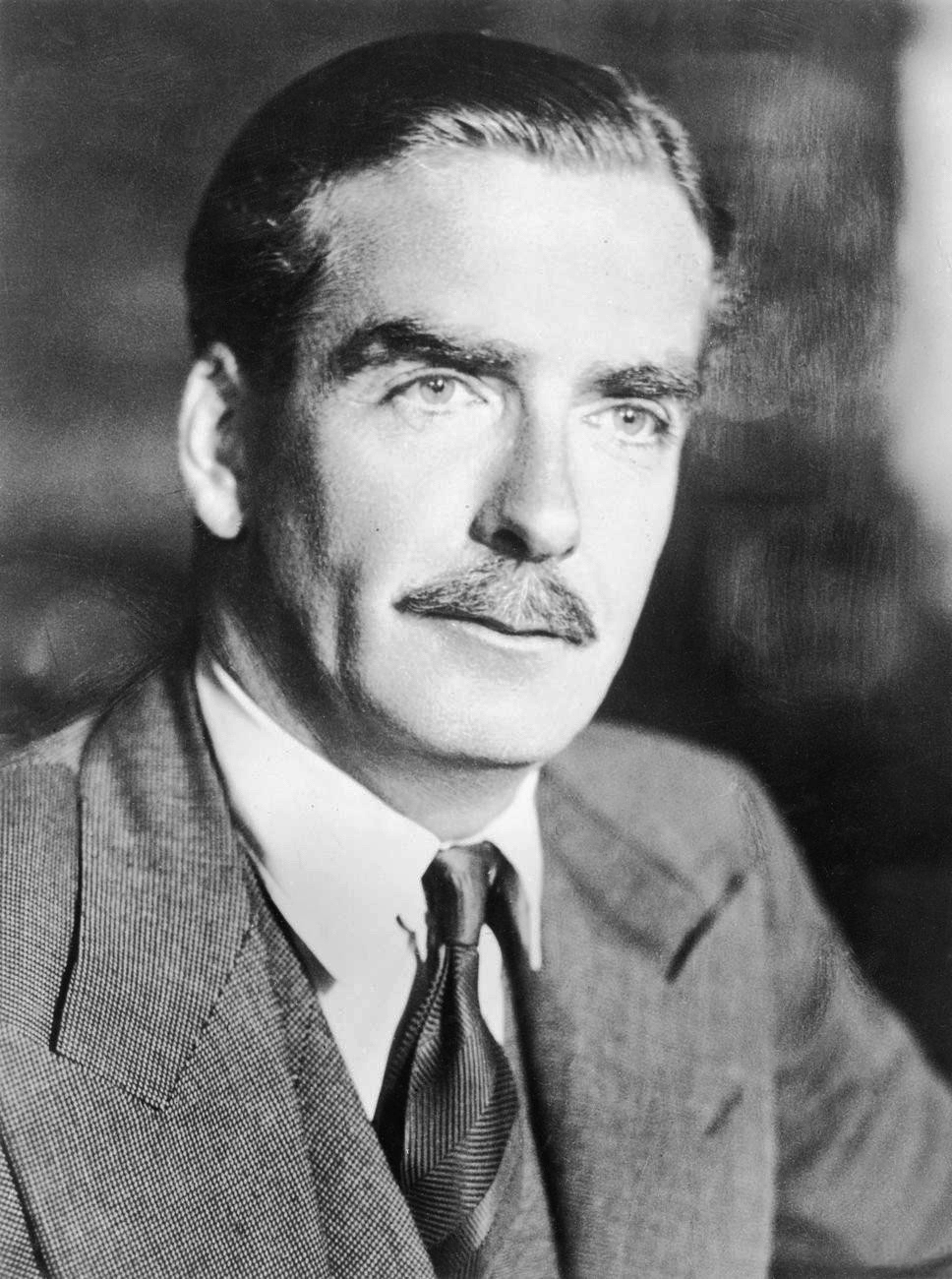
Anthony Eden, British foreign secretary 1940–1945

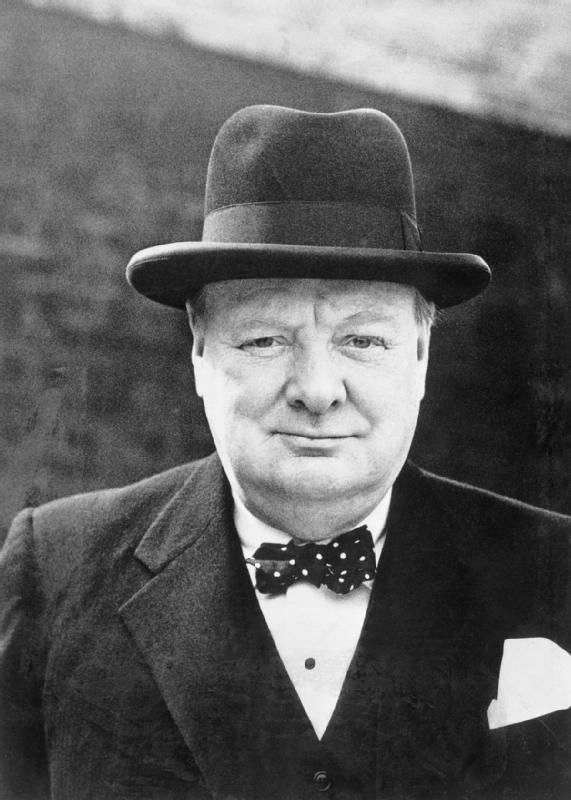
Winston Churchill, British prime minister 1940–1945

Brand was taken to Cairo, where he was questioned by the British for weeks. On 22 June 1944 he was interviewed by Ira Hirschmann of the American War Refugee Board; Hirschmann wrote a positive report about Brand, but his influence was limited. Brand went on hunger strike for 17 days in protest at his detention.

The British, Americans and Soviets discussed the proposal. British Foreign Secretary (later Prime Minister) Anthony Eden wrote a memo on 26 June outlining the options. The British were convinced they were dealing with a Himmler trick, that Grosz was a double agent, and that Brand's mission was a "smokescreen" for the Germans to broker a peace deal without the Soviet Union. If the deal had gone ahead and large numbers of Jews had been released in central Europe, Allied airborne and possibly land-based military operations might have had to stop. Bauer believes the British feared this was Himmler's motive—to turn the Jews into human shields—because it would have allowed the Germans to devote their forces to fighting the Red Army.

The Americans were more open to negotiating. A rift developed between them and the British who, Bauer writes, were worried about large-scale Jewish immigration to Palestine, then under British control. Eden did suggest a counter-proposal on 1 July, but it was reduced, Bauer writes, to a ridiculous minimum. He told the American government that the British would allow Brand to return to Budapest with a message for Eichmann suggesting that 1,500 Jewish children be given safe passage to Switzerland; 5,000 from Bulgaria and Romania be allowed to leave for Palestine; and that Germany guarantee safe conduct for ships carrying Jewish refugees. He did not say what he would offer in return.

On 11 July Prime Minister Winston Churchill put an end to the idea when he told Eden that the murder of the Jews was "probably the greatest and most horrible crime ever committed", and that there should be "no negotiations of any kind on this subject". Of Brand's mission he wrote: "The project which has been put forward through a very doubtful channel seems itself also to be of the most nondescript character. I would not take it seriously." The Cabinet Committee on Refugees decided on 13 July to "totally ignore the combined Brandt–Gestapo approach".

=== Leak to media ===
The British leaked details of Eichmann's proposal to the media. According to Michael Fleming, the BBC was the first to report it, which means, he writes, "it seems that the PWE [Political Warfare Executive] (and hence the Foreign Office) released the information". On 19 July 1944—the day before the 20 July plot, the attempted assassination of Adolf Hitler—the New York Herald Tribune (dateline London, 18 July) reported that two Hungarian government emissaries in Turkey had proposed that Hungarian Jews be given safe passage in exchange for British and American pharmaceuticals and transport for the Germans. On 20 July The Times called it "one of the most loathsome" stories of the war, an attempt to "blackmail, deceive and split" the Allies, and a "new level of fantasy and self-deception".

The mass deportation of Hungarian Jews had already stopped by the time of the leak. Following publication in mid-June of parts of the Vrba-Wetzler report, which described in detail the use of gas chambers inside Auschwitz, the Jewish Agency in Geneva had cabled London asking that Hungarian ministers be held personally responsible for the killings. The cable was intercepted and passed to Hungarian regent Miklós Horthy, who on 7 July 1944 ordered an end to the deportations. The British released Brand on 5 October 1944. Brand said they would not allow him to return to Hungary and forced him to travel to Palestine. Bauer disputes this; in his view, Brand was simply afraid of returning to Budapest, convinced the Germans would murder him.

=== Himmler's involvement ===
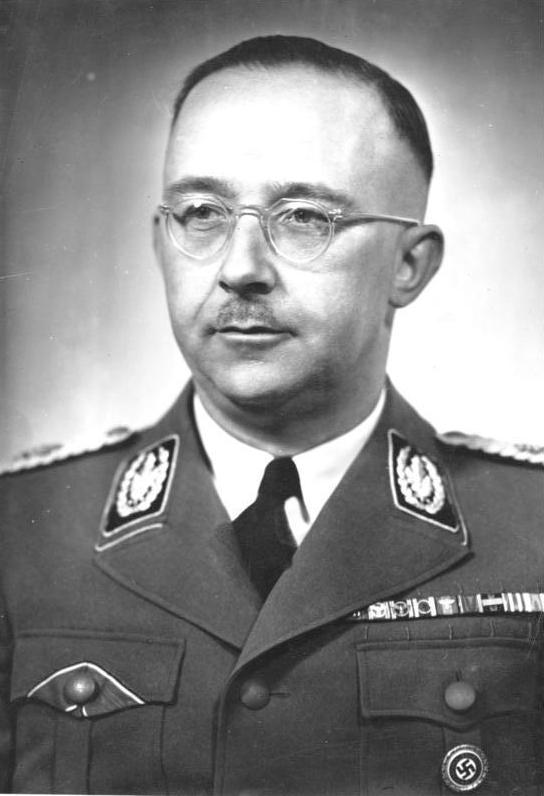
Heinrich Himmler

Germany's Foreign Minister, Joachim von Ribbentrop, had apparently known nothing about the proposal. He cabled Brigadeführer Edmund Veesenmayer of the SS on 20 July 1944 to ask about it, and was told on 22 July that Brand and Grosz had been sent to Turkey on the orders of Heinrich Himmler, head of the SS. Eichmann himself said during interrogation after the war that the order had come from Himmler, as did SS officer Kurt Becher: "Himmler said to me: 'Take whatever you can from the Jews. Promise them whatever you want. What we will keep is another matter.'"

According to Bauer, the "clumsiness of the approach has been a wonderment to all observers". Bauer argues that Eichmann wanted to murder Jews, not sell them, but was forced instead to act as Himmler's reluctant messenger. On the day Brand left Germany for Istanbul in May 1944, Eichmann was in Auschwitz checking that it was ready for the trainloads of Jews about to arrive from Hungary. The camp's commander, Obersturmbannführer Rudolf Höss, said it would be difficult to process such large numbers, whereupon Eichmann ordered that new arrivals be gassed immediately rather than going through "selection". This does not suggest that he was going to halt the killing until Brand returned from Istanbul.

Gerhard Clages of the SS was present at one of the meetings; in Bauer's view, this signals that Himmler was interested in secret peace talks. Brand and Grosz arrived in Istanbul just two months before the attempted assassination of Adolf Hitler on 20 July 1944. Himmler knew that attempts might be made on Hitler's life, although not where and when. He may have wanted to broker for peace in case Hitler did not survive, using low-level agents for plausible deniability; in the event that Hitler did survive, Bauer argues, Himmler would be able to offer him a peace deal with the West that excluded the Soviet Union. Brand himself came to believe that the proposal had been designed to drive a wedge between the Allies. Two months before his death in 1964, at the trial in Germany of Eichmann's deputies Hermann Krumey and Otto Hunsche, he said he had "made a terrible mistake in passing this on to the British. It is now clear to me that Himmler sought to sow suspicion among the Allies as a preparation for his much desired Nazi-Western coalition against Moscow."

=== Kasztner train ===
Brand's failure to return to Budapest was a disaster for the Aid and Rescue Committee. On 27 May Hansi Brand, who at some point during this period had become Kasztner's lover, was arrested and beaten by the Hungarian Arrow Cross. Kasztner wrote that on 9 June Eichmann told him: "If I do not receive a positive reply within three days, I shall operate the mill at Auschwitz" ("die Muehle laufen lasse"). During his trial in Jerusalem in 1961, Eichmann denied having said this to Kasztner. He told the court that he did not have the authority to stop or start what was happening in Auschwitz, or to change the deal. The order from Berlin had said: "Deportations will continue in the meanwhile and will not be stopped until Joel Brand returns with a statement to the effect that these matters have been accepted by the Jewish organizations abroad." Hansi Brand told Claude Lanzman in 1979:

Kasztner train passengers on their way to Switzerland from the Bergen-Belsen concentration camp, August or December 1944

We ... [lived] between fear and despair and hope. And that formed itself into such a heap of stuff, that I can't really describe it – how it was and what it was. Every evening, we went to pieces and during the night, we tried to build ourselves up again, so we could go into the street ... and look like human beings again ... And [it] was like being in a windmill; it turned and moved.

Bauer argues that the Aid and Rescue committee made the mistake of almost adopting the antisemitic belief in unlimited Jewish power, that Jewish leaders could move around freely and persuade the Allies to act, and that American Jews had easy access to money and goods. The committee had similar trust in the Allies, but the latter were preparing for the invasion of Normandy, which began on 6 June 1944. "At that crucial moment," writes Bauer, "to antagonize the Soviets because of some hare-brained Gestapo plan to ransom Jews was totally out of the question."

Despite the setbacks, Kasztner, Hansi Brand and the rest of the committee secured the release of around 1,684 Jews, including 273 children, who were allowed to leave Budapest for Switzerland by train on 30 June 1944. The committee paid SS officer Kurt Becher $1000 per person in foreign currency, shares, jewellery and gold, raised from the wealthier passengers to cover the cost of the rest. After an unexplained detour to the Bergen-Belsen concentration camp, the passengers arrived in Switzerland in two batches in August and December that year. Joel Brand's mother, sister and niece were on the train, as were 10 members of Kasztner's family and 388 people from the Kolozsvár ghetto in his home town. Kasztner's relationship with these passengers led to the criticism that his negotiations with Becher had focused on saving people he knew, an allegation that led to his assassination in 1957.

== Later life ==
=== Move to Israel ===
Bauer concludes that Brand was a courageous man who had passionately wanted to help the Jewish people, but his life was plagued after the mission by suspicion, including from other members of the Aid and Rescue Committee, because of his failure to return to Budapest. After the British released him, he joined the Stern Gang, who were fighting to remove the British from Palestine. He and Hansi Brand lived for the rest of their lives in Israel, at first moving to the Givat Brenner kibbutz, then to Tel Aviv, with their two sons.

=== Testimony ===
Brand offered testimony about the blood-for-goods proposal during several trials. In 1954 he testified at the controversial libel trial in Jerusalem of Malchiel Gruenwald, who was sued by the Israeli government on behalf of Rezső Kasztner. Gruenwald was a Hungarian Holocaust survivor who had moved to Israel after the war. In a self-published pamphlet in 1952 he accused Kasztner, by then an Israeli civil servant, of having collaborated with the Nazis by dealing with Eichmann. Brand testified for Kasztner, but instead of defending him took the opportunity to accuse the Jewish Agency, whose officials became the first Israeli government, of having helped the British scupper the blood-for-goods proposal.

After a trial that lasted 18 months, the judge concluded that, by negotiating with Eichmann, failing to warn the many to save the few on the Kasztner train, and writing an affidavit after the war for Kurt Becher, Kasztner had "sold his soul to the devil". It was because of Kasztner's support for Becher that the Americans decided not to prosecute Becher at Nuremberg. Kasztner also wrote affidavits for SS officers Hans Jüttner, Dieter Wisliceny and Hermann Krumey.

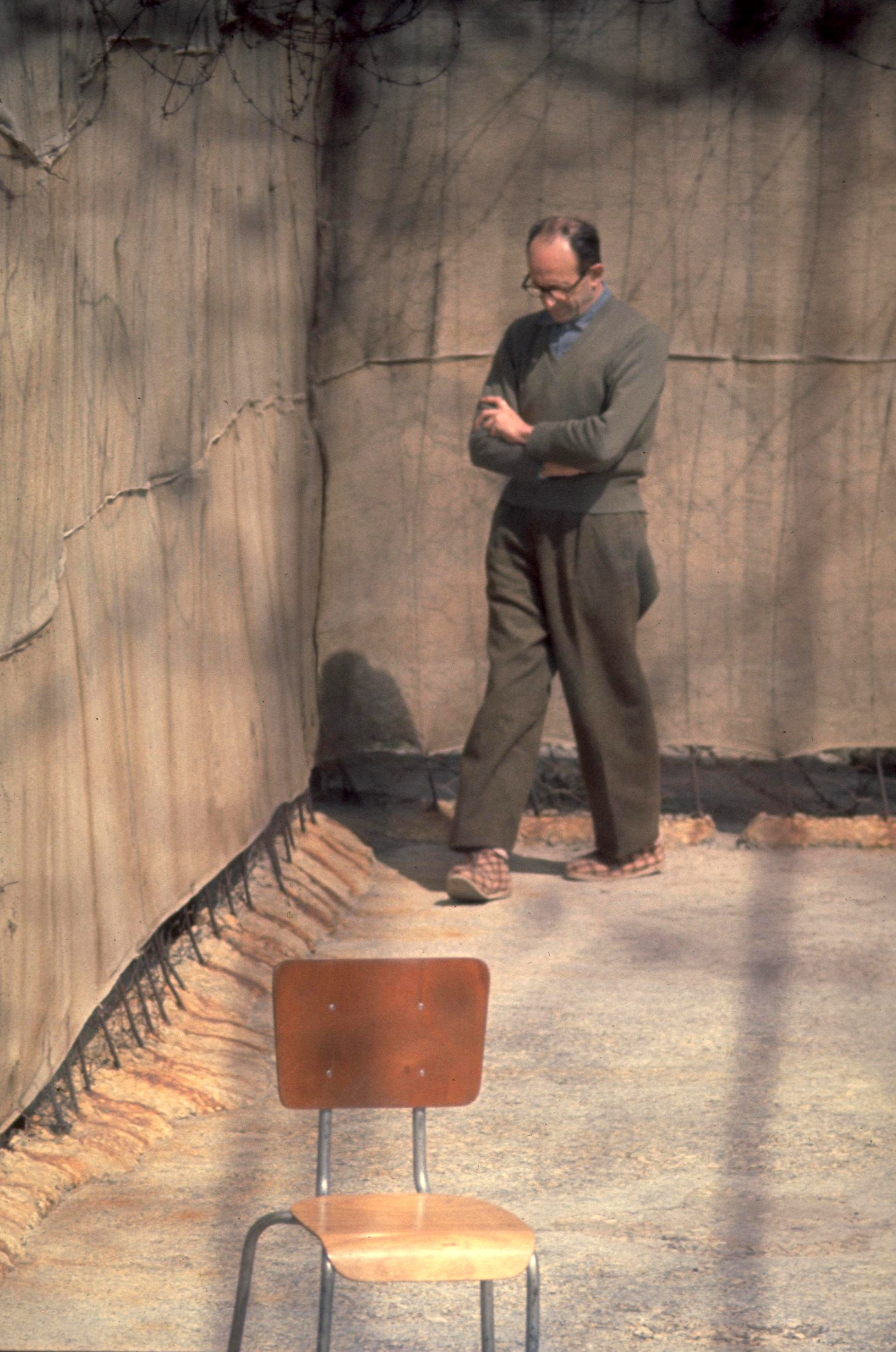
Eichmann in his prison yard in Israel. He was hanged on 31 May 1962.

The judge said that Kasztner's failure to do more to warn the community that they were being sent to the gas chambers, not resettled, had helped Eichmann maintain order, and that the Kasztner train had been a payoff. Tom Segev called the ruling "one of the most heartless in the history of Israel, perhaps the most heartless ever". The Supreme Court of Israel overturned most of the verdict in January 1958, ruling that the lower court had "erred seriously", but Kasztner was assassinated in 1957 as a result of the earlier judgment.

=== Eichmann and Frankfurt trials ===
Brand's book was published in Israel in 1956 as Bi-sheliḥut nidonim la mavet and in German in 1956 as Die Geschichte von Joel Brand. It appeared in English in 1958 as Advocate for the Dead: The Story of Joel Brand by Alex Weissberg, and was serialized in March and April that year by The Observer, which called it "the strangest story to come out of the war".

Joel and Hansi Brand both testified in 1961 during the trial of Adolf Eichmann in Jerusalem. Eichmann said he had chosen Brand because he had seemed like an "honest, idealistic man". That year Life magazine called Brand "a man who lives in the shadows with a broken heart". In May 1964 he testified in Frankfurt against two of Eichmann's assistants, SS-Obersturmbannführer Hermann Krumey and SS-Hauptsturmführer Otto Hunsche.

== Death ==
Brand died of a heart attack, aged 58, during a visit to Germany in July 1964. He told an interviewer shortly before his death: "An accident of life placed the fate of one million human beings on my shoulders. I eat and sleep and think only of them." Over 800 mourners attended his funeral in Tel Aviv, including Colonel Arieh Baz on behalf of Israel's President Zalman Shazar, and Teddy Kollek, director-general of the prime minister's office, on behalf of Prime Minister Levi Eshkol. The eulogy was delivered by Gideon Hausner, the attorney general who prosecuted Adolf Eichmann.

== Sources ==
=== Works cited ===
- Bauer, Yehuda (1989). "The Mission of Joel Brand". In Marrus, Michael Robert (ed.). The Nazi Holocaust. Part 9: The End of the Holocaust. Westport: Meckler. pp. 65–125. ISBN 0-88736-265-6.
- Bauer, Yehuda (1994). Jews for Sale: Nazi–Jewish Negotiations, 1933–1945. New Haven: Yale University Press. ISBN 0-300-05913-2.
- Bauer, Yehuda (1999). "Gisi Fleischmann". In Ofer, Dalia; Weitzman, Lenore J. (eds.). Women in the Holocaust. New Haven: Yale University Press. pp. 253–264. ISBN 0-300-07354-2.
- Berenbaum, Michael (2002). "Foreword". In Braham, Randolph L.; Miller, Scott (eds.). The Nazis' Last Victims: The Holocaust in Hungary. Detroit: Wayne State University Press. pp. 9–15. ISBN 0-8143-2737-0.
- Braham, Randolph L. (2000). The Politics of Genocide: The Holocaust in Hungary (condensed ed.). Detroit: Wayne State University Press. ISBN 0-8143-2691-9.
- Braham, Randolph L. (2002). "The Holocaust in Hungary: A Retrospective Analysis". In Braham, Randolph L.; Miller, Scott (eds.). The Nazis' Last Victims: The Holocaust in Hungary. Detroit: Wayne State University Press. pp. 27–43. ISBN 0-8143-2737-0.
- Braham, Randolph L. (2016a). The Politics of Genocide: The Holocaust in Hungary. Vol. 1. New York: Columbia University Press. ISBN 978-0880337113.
- Braham, Randolph L. (2016b). The Politics of Genocide: The Holocaust in Hungary. Vol. 2. New York: Columbia University Press. ISBN 978-0880337113.
- Brand, Hansi (1979). "Claude Lanzmann Shoah Collection, Interview with Hansi Brand". New York: Steven Spielberg Film and Video Archive, United States Holocaust Memorial Museum.
- Brand, Joel; Weissberg, Alex (1958). Advocate for the Dead: The Story of Joel Brand. London: Andre Deutsch. OCLC 1199641. First published as Die Geschichte von Joel Brand, 1956; also published as Desperate Mission: Joel Brand's Story.
- "The Trial of Adolf Eichmann". Nizkor Project. 11 April 1961 – 29 May 1962. Archived from the original on 23 July 2019.
- Brand, Hansi (30 May 1961). "The Trial of Adolf Eichmann. Testimony of Hansi Brand, session 58". Nizkor Project. p. 1/5. Archived from the original on 30 October 2018.
- Brand, Joel (29 May 1961). "Trial of Adolf Eichmann. Testimony of Joel Brand, session 56". Nizkor Project. p. 1/4. Archived from the original on 29 October 2018.
- Brand, Joel (30 May 1961). "Trial of Adolf Eichmann. Testimony of Joel Brand, session 57". nizkor.org. Nizkor Project. p. 1/6. Archived from the original on 18 September 2018.
- Breitman, Richard; Aronson, Shlomo (1992). "The End of the 'Final Solution'?: Nazi Plans to Ransom Jews in 1944". Central European History. 25 (2): 177–203. doi:10.1017/s0008938900020318. JSTOR 4546259. S2CID 146636290.
- Cesarani, David (2007). Becoming Eichmann. New York: Da Capo Press. ISBN 978-0-306-81539-3.
- Churchill, Winston (1953). The Second World War: Triumph and Tragedy. Vol. 6. Boston, MA: Houghton Mifflin Company. OCLC 317641286.
- Cohen, Michael J. (2013) [1985]. Churchill and the Jews, 1900–1948. Abingdon and New York: Routledge. ISBN 978-0-7146-3254-4.
- Crowe, David M. (2007) [2004]. Oskar Schindler: The Untold Account of His Life, Wartime Activities, and the True Story behind the List. New York: Basic Books. ISBN 978-0465002535.
- Fatran, Gila (Fall 1994). "The 'Working Group'". Holocaust and Genocide Studies. 8 (2). Translated by Greenwood, Naftali: 164–201. doi:10.1093/hgs/8.2.164.
- Fleming, Michael (2014). Auschwitz, the Allies and Censorship of the Holocaust. Cambridge and New York: Cambridge University Press. ISBN 978-1-107-06279-5.
- Gouri, Haim (2004). Facing the Glass Booth: The Jerusalem Trial of Adolf Eichmann. Detroit: Wayne State University Press. ISBN 978-0814330876.
- Hecht, Ben (1999) [1961]. Perfidy. New York: Milah Press. ISBN 978-0964688636.
- Halász, Dorottya Sziszkoszné (Fall 2000). "The United States and the Joel Brand Mission: Help or Hindrance?". Hungarian Journal of English and American Studies. 62 (2): 259–266. JSTOR 41274108.
- Hilberg, Raul (2003) [1961]. The Destruction of the European Jews. Vol. 3. New Haven and London: Yale University Press. ISBN 978-0300095579.
- Kadar, Gabor; Vagi, Zoltan (2004) [2001]. Self-Financing Genocide: The Gold Train, the Becher Case and the Wealth of Hungarian Jews. Budapest and New York: Central European University Press. ISBN 978-963-9241-53-4.
- Löb, Ladislaus (2009) [2008]. Rezso Kasztner. The Daring Rescue of Hungarian Jews: A Survivor's Account. London: Pimlico. ISBN 978-1845950088.
- Porter, Anna (2007). Kasztner's Train. New York: Douglas & McIntyre Ltd.
- Rose, Paul Lawrence (December 1991). "Joel Brand's 'Interim Agreement' and the Course of Nazi-Jewish Negotiations 1944–1945". The Historical Journal. 34 (4): 909–929. doi:10.1017/S0018246X00017350. JSTOR 2639587. S2CID 159565197.
- Segev, Tom (2000) [1991]. The Seventh Million. New York: Henry Holt and Company. ISBN 0-8050-6660-8.
- Szita, Szabolcs (2005). Trading in Lives?: Operations of the Jewish Relief and Rescue Committee in Budapest, 1944–1945. Budapest and New York: Central European University Press. ISBN 963-7326-30-8.
- Wasserstein, Bernard (1999) [1979]. Britain and the Jews of Europe: 1939–1945. London: Leicester University Press. ISBN 978-0718501587.
