= Yehuda Bauer =

Israeli Holocaust historian (1926–2024)

- יהודה באואר
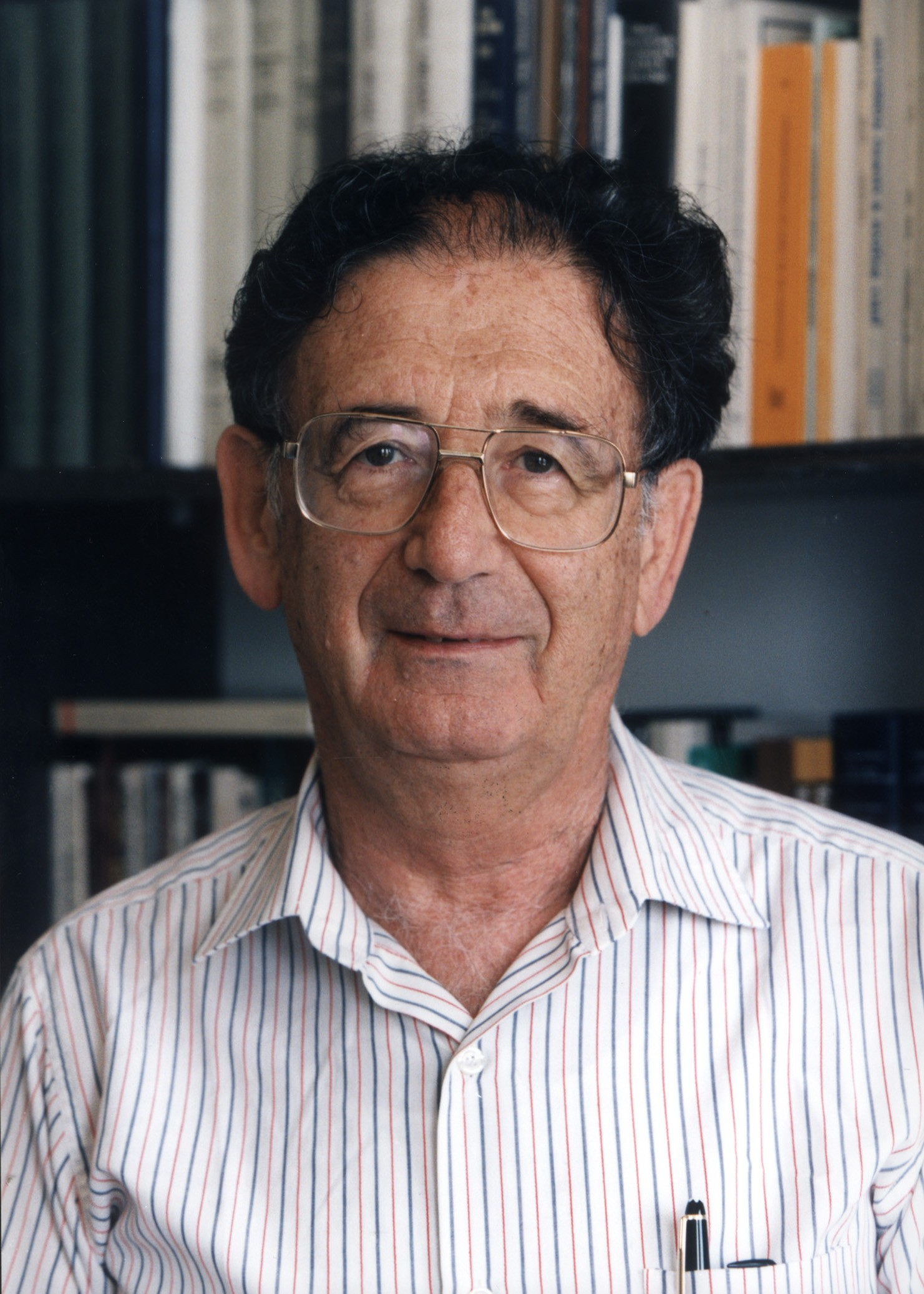
- Bauer in 2008
- Born: 6 April 1926; Prague, Czechoslovakia
- Died: 18 October 2024 (aged 98); Jerusalem, Israel

Academic background
- Education: Cardiff University; Hebrew University
- Thesis: British Mandate of Palestine

Academic work
- Discipline: Holocaust studies
- Institutions: Hebrew University

Yehuda Bauer (Hebrew: יהודה באואר; 6 April 1926 – 18 October 2024) was a Czech-born Israeli historian and scholar of the Holocaust. He was a professor of Holocaust studies at the Avraham Harman Institute of Contemporary Jewry at the Hebrew University of Jerusalem.

== Biography ==
Yehuda Bauer was born in Prague, Czechoslovakia on 6 April 1926. He was fluent in Czech, Slovak and German. Bauer later learned Hebrew, Yiddish, English, French and Polish. His father had strong Zionist convictions and during the 1930s he tried to raise money to relocate his family to the British Mandate of Palestine. On the day Nazi Germany annexed Czechoslovakia, 15 March 1939, the family immigrated to Palestine by managing to get past Nazi officials on a train which slipped them over the border into Poland. From there they moved via Romania to Palestine. His father, an engineer, faced challenges in securing employment, while his mother supported the family by working as a seamstress.

Bauer attended high school in Haifa and at sixteen, inspired by his history teacher, Rachel Krulik, he decided to dedicate himself to studying history. Upon completing high school, he joined the Palmach. He earned a scholarship to study history at Cardiff University but paused his education to serve in the 1948 Arab-Israeli War. He completed his bachelor's degree in 1948 and obtained a master's degree in 1950.

After returning to Israel, he joined Kibbutz Shoval, a socialist collective in the Negev Desert, in 1952, and became actively involved in Mapam, a socialist junior partner of the dominant Labour Party (Mapai). He received his doctorate from Hebrew University in 1960, and the following year, he became a professor at the university’s Institute of Contemporary Jewry, where he served for 34 years. He was a visiting professor at Brandeis University, Yale University, Richard Stockton College, and Clark University.

In 1995, Bauer left his position at Hebrew University to direct the International Institute for Holocaust Research at Yad Vashem, Israel’s official Holocaust memorial. Although he resigned from his position as director in 2000, he continued to serve as an academic adviser until his death. Even shortly before, he upheld a regular lecture schedule, both in person and remotely, often addressing diverse global audiences in various languages on different days. Bauer was the founding editor of the journal Holocaust and Genocide Studies, and served on the editorial board of the Encyclopaedia of the Holocaust, published by Yad Vashem in 1990.

Bauer was awarded the Israel Prize, the nation's highest cultural honor, in 1998.

Bauer's first marriage was to Shula Bauer, which ended in divorce. In 1993, he married Ilana Meroz, who died in 2011. He had two daughters, Anat Tsach and Danit Cohen, as well as three stepsons: Gal, Eyel, and Ran. He also had six grandchildren and six great-grandchildren.

Bauer died in Jerusalem on 18 October 2024, at the age of 98.

== Views and opinions ==
Bauer specialized in the Holocaust, antisemitism — a word which he insisted should be written unhyphenated — and the Jewish resistance movement during the Holocaust, and he argued for a wider definition of the term. In Bauer's view, resistance to the Nazis comprised not only physical opposition but any activity that gave the Jewish people dignity and humanity in the most humiliating and inhumane conditions. Furthermore, Bauer disputed the popular view that most Jews went to their deaths passively — "like sheep to the slaughter". He argued that, given the conditions in which the Jews of Eastern Europe had to endure, what is surprising is not how little resistance there was, but rather how much.

Bauer defended Rudolf Kasztner and the Aid and Rescue Committee, who have been criticized for allegedly not publicizing the Vrba-Wetzler report which documented the deportation of the Hungarian Jews to Auschwitz. According to Bauer, conditions prevented Kasztner and other Jewish leaders from publicizing what they knew, and prevented Jews from escaping. Not only did Kasztner hide what is awaiting the Jews of Hungary, after George Mantello obtained the report over two months delay in Switzerland via Romanian diplomat Florian Manilou who got it is Budapest from Moshe Krausz, Kasztner implored him not to publicize it, which Mantello declined to comply with.

At Yad Vashem while its chief historian, Bauer exclaimed that "Hillel Kook saved no one!", although the Emergency Committee for the Rescue of European Jewry (aka Bergson Group), Kook's rescue activist group in America, kept pressuring President Roosevelt to help the Jews of Europe. It forced Roosevelt to establish the War Refugee Board in January 1944, also due to pressure by Jewish Treasury Secretary Henry Morgenthau Jr and his team. The WRB saved large number of Jews, in part by the Raoul Wallenberg mission in Budapest. According to American historian Professor David Wyman the WRB saved an estimated 200,000 in Europe.

Bauer believed that Hitler was the key figure who caused the Holocaust, and that at some point in the later half of 1941, he gave a series of orders which called for the genocide of the entire Jewish population. Bauer pointed to the discovery of an entry in Himmler's notebook dated 18 December 1941 where Himmler wrote down the question "What to do with the Jews of Russia?" According to the same notebook, Hitler's response to the question was "Exterminate them as partisans." In Bauer's view, this is as close as historians will ever get to a definitive order from Hitler ordering the Holocaust. Bauer believed that, at about the same time, Hitler gave further verbal orders for the Holocaust, but unfortunately for historians, nobody bothered to write them down. What the Nazis called the "Final Solution of the Jewish Question" is considered to have been formalized at the Wannsee Conference on 20 January 1942, although Bauer rejected this view, calling it a "silly story”.

Bauer disagreed with those who argue that the Holocaust was just another genocide. Though he agreed that there were other genocides in history, he argued that the Holocaust was the worst single case of genocide in history, in which every member of a nation was selected for annihilation. American historian Henry Friedlander argued that the Romani and the disabled were just as much victims of the Holocaust as the Jews were. However, Bauer said that the Romani were subject to genocide (just not "the Holocaust") and he supported the demands of the Romani for reparations from Germany.

Another trend that Bauer denounced was the representation of the Holocaust as a mystical experience outside the normal range of human understanding. He argued against the work of some Orthodox rabbis and theologians who have said that the Holocaust was the work of God and part of a mysterious master plan for the Jewish people. In Bauer's view, those who seek to promote this line of thinking argue that God is just and good, while simultaneously bringing down the Holocaust on the Jewish people. Bauer argued that a God who inflicts the Shoah on his Chosen People is neither good nor just.

In January 2012, Bauer's article in the Israel Journal of Foreign Affairs entitled "The Holocaust, America and American Jewry" precipitated a bitter debate between him, Rafael Medoff (Wyman Institute) and Alexander J. Groth (University of California, Davis), on what the US Government and the Jews of America could and could not have done to rescue the Jews of Europe. Bauer has criticized the American political scientist Daniel Goldhagen, who writes that the Holocaust was the result of the allegedly unique "eliminationist" antisemitic culture of the Germans. He has accused Goldhagen of Germanophobic racism, and of only selecting evidence which is favorable to his thesis.

Bauer was known for his criticism of other historians but directed his sharpest rebukes at politicians whom he believed manipulated the Holocaust to serve their agendas, particularly singling out Prime Minister Benjamin Netanyahu. In an interview with The Times of Israel in August 2023, he stated, "They use the Holocaust as a political tool. This is particularly true of the prime minister. He has no understanding at all—he simply does not grasp what happened. He deals with Iran; he knows something about Iran, but he knows nothing about the Holocaust."

In 2003, Bauer stated that "What we have here between the Israelis and the Palestinians is an armed conflict – if one side becomes stronger there is a chance of genocide." When one of the visitors asked, "Am I to understand that you think Israel could commit genocide on the Palestinian people?," Bauer answered "Yes," and added, "Just two days ago, extremist settlers passed out flyers to rid Arabs from this land. Ethnic cleansing results in mass killing." Bauer said that opinion polls show that a high percentage of Palestinians want to get rid of Jews.

Bauer was one of the architects of the Working Definition of Antisemitism, which classifies mainstream Palestinian positions as antisemitic. He has argued that calling for Palestinian right of return is antisemitic because he believes it is a prelude to the genocide of Jews.

Concerning Pope Benedict XVI's pilgrimage to Israel and Jordan, Bauer argued that the Pope meant well and tried to walk the tightrope between Arab-Palestinian-Muslim and Palestinian-Christian enmity toward Israel and the Jews on the one hand, and the collective trauma of Jews in Israel and elsewhere regarding the Holocaust on the other.

== Awards and recognition ==
International Dimensions of Holocaust Education, UNESCO, 31 January 2012

Bauer received recognition for his work in the field of Holocaust studies and the prevention of genocide.

- In 1998, he was awarded the Israel Prize, for "history of the Jewish people", primarily in connection with his Holocaust studies.
- In 2001, he was elected a Member of the Israel Academy of Sciences and Humanities.
- In 2005, he was awarded the Illis quorum by the Swedish government.
- In 2008, he received the Yakir Yerushalayim (Worthy Citizen of Jerusalem) award from the city of Jerusalem.

In addition, he served as an academic adviser to Yad Vashem, academic adviser to the Task Force for International Cooperation on Holocaust Education, Remembrance, and Research, and senior adviser to the Swedish Government on the International Forum on Genocide Prevention.

== Published works ==
=== Authored books ===
- The initial organization of the Holocaust survivors in Bavaria, Jerusalem: Yad Vashem, 1970
- From diplomacy to Resistance: A history of Jewish Palestine. Philadelphia: Jewish Publication Society of America, 1970. Translated from Hebrew by Alton M. Winters.
- Flight and rescue: Brichah. New York: Random House, 1970
- They chose life: Jewish resistance in the Holocaust. New York: The American Jewish Committee, 1973
- Rescue operations through Vilna, Jerusalem: Yad Vashem, 1973
- My brother's keeper: A history of the American Jewish Joint Distribution Committee. Philadelphia: The Jewish Publication Society of America, 1974
- The Holocaust and the struggle of the Yishuv as factors in the establishment of the State of Israel. [Jerusalem]: [Yad Vashem 1976]
- Trends in Holocaust research, Jerusalem: Yad Vashem, 1977
- The Holocaust in historical perspective. Seattle: University of Washington Press, 1978
- The Judenräte: some conclusions. [Jerusalem]: [Yad Vashem, 1979]
- The Jewish emergence from powerlessness. Toronto: University of Toronto Press, 1979
- The Holocaust as historical experience: Essays and a discussion, New York: Holmes & Meier, 1981
- American Jewry and the Holocaust. The American Jewish Joint Distribution Committee,. Detroit: Wayne State University Press, 1981 ISBN 0-8143-1672-7
- Jewish foreign policy during the Holocaust. New York: 1984
- Jewish survivors in DP camps and She'erith Hapletah, Jerusalem: Yad Vashem, 1984
- Antisemitism today: Myth and reality. Jerusalem: Hebrew University. Institute of Contemporary Jewry, 1985
- Antisemitism in Western Europe. 1988
- ed., Present-day Antisemitism: Proceedings of the Eighth International Seminar of the Study Circle on World Jewry under the auspices of the President of Israel, Chaim Herzog, Jerusalem 29–31 December 1985. Jerusalem: The Vidal Sassoon International Center for the Study of Antisemitism, The Hebrew University, 1988
- Out of the ashes: The impact of American Jews on post-Holocaust European Jewry. Oxford: Pergamon Press, c. 1989
- The mission of Joel Brand. 1989
- ed., Remembering for the future: Working papers and addenda. Oxford: Pergamon Press, 1989
- Jewish reactions to the Holocaust. Tel-Aviv: MOD Books, 1989
- Résistance et passivité juive face à l'Holocauste. 1989
- Out of the Ashes. Oxford, Pergamon Press, 1989
- Antisemitism and anti-Zionism—New and old. 1990
- World War II. 1990
- Is the Holocaust explicable? 1990
- La place d'Auschwitz dans la Shoah. 1990
- The Brichah: Jerusalem: Yad Vashem, 1990
- The Holocaust, religion and Jewish history. 1991
- Who was responsible and when? Some well-known documents revisited. 1991
- Holocaust and genocide. Some comparisons. 1991
- The tragedy of the Slovak Jews within the framework of Nazi policy towards the Jews in general, 1992
- Vom christlichen Judenhass zum modernen Antisemitismus—Ein Erklaerungsversuch. 1992
- On the applicability of definitions—Anti-Semitism in present-day Europe. 1993
- Antisemitism as a European and world problem. 1993
- The Wannsee "Conference" and its significance for the "Final Solution". 1993
- Antisemitism in the 1990s. 1993
- The significance of the Final Solution. 1994
- Jews for sale?: Nazi-Jewish negotiations,. New Haven: Yale University Press, October 1994
- The Impact of the Holocaust. Thousand Oaks, CA: Sage, 1996
- A history of the Holocaust. New York: Franklin Watts, 1982, 2001
- Rethinking the Holocaust. Haven, Yale University, 2001
- The Jews – A Contrary People. LIT Verlag, 2014, ISBN 978-3-643-90501-7

=== Book chapters ===
- "Gypsies", in Yisrael Gutman and Michael Berenbaum, eds., Anatomy of the Auschwitz death camp, Bloomington: Indiana University Press, in association with the United States Holocaust Memorial Museum, Washington, D.C. 1994. ISBN 0-253-32684-2

=== Edited conference papers ===
- Menachem Z. Rosensaft and Yehuda Bauer (eds.), Antisemitism: threat to Western civilization. Jerusalem: Vidal Sassoon International Center for the Study of Antisemitism, The Hebrew University of Jerusalem, 1989. ISBN 965-222-126-0. (Papers based on a conference held at the New York University School of Law, 27 October 1985).
- Yehuda Bauer (ed.), The danger of Antisemitism in Central and Eastern Europe in the wake of 1989–1990. Jerusalem: The Vidal Sassoon International Center for the Study of Antisemitism, The Hebrew University of Jerusalem: 1991. ISBN 965-222-242-9 (Based on a conference held 28–29 October 1990, in Jerusalem)

== See also ==
- List of Israel Prize recipients
