= The Politics of Genocide =

The Politics of Genocide may refer to:

- Edward S. Herman#The Politics of Genocide
- Randolph L. Braham#Selected works
