= Ottó Komoly =

Hungarian humanitarian (1892–1945)

- Born: 26 March 1892; Budapest, Kingdom of Hungary
- Died: 1 January 1945 (aged 52); Budapest, Kingdom of Hungary

Ottó Komoly (also known as Nathan Zeev Kohn) (26 March 1892 – 1 January 1945) was a Hungarian Jewish engineer, officer, Zionist, and humanitarian leader in Hungary. He is credited with saving thousands of Jewish children during the German occupation of Budapest in World War II. He was called a pacifier and unifier by nature by Randolph Braham who did everything possible to put an end to the perennial conflicts within and among the various Zionist groups and organizations.

== Early career ==
Educated as an engineer, Komoly was drafted in the Hungarian Army in World War I. He obtained the rank of Lieutenant, was injured in action and subsequently decorated. After the war, his military honors gave him credibility and a high status in Hungarian society, in spite of wide spread antisemitism in the country described in History of the Jews in Hungary. Thus, he was exempted from most of the restrictions that other Jews suffered in the buildup to World War II.

His family was considering emigration to Palestine in 1939, but he decided to stay in Hungary to help local Jews escape persecution by using his status and influence.

== Literary background. ==
Ottó Komoly had an interest and gift for literary activities from an early age. When he was 15, Otto began translating Herzl’s Zionist novel “Altneuland,” into Hungarian. He wrote poems (Későn, 1917 - 'Too Late) as well as diary notes during his military service in WWI. In 1919 he published 'A Zsidó Nép Jövője' (Future of the Jewish People) . In 1925 he wrote 'Alkotás ' (Creating) reflecting on his determination to make contributions, and in 1942 'Cionista Életszemlélet' (Zionist World View). Komoly also considered the situation developing in and around Hungary and the likely consequences. He also spent a substantial amount of time in 1943-44 in creating a Memorandum (four versions are also preserved in Yad Vashem's collection) aimed at persuading the Hungarian government to alter its anti-Jewish policies. His most memorable heritage must be the set of hand-written diaries, of which the last (1944) is of truly historical importance . A combination of his professional and literary talents gave rise to his book 'Hogyan készül az én házam?' (How is my house built?).

== Political and Rescue activities ==
Komoly became the Chairman of the Zionist Federation in Hungary in 1941, where his father was previously the chairman.

Together with Rudolf Kasztner he led the Aid and Rescue Committee, which provided assistance to Jews fleeing persecution in Poland and Slovakia.

After German troops entered Hungary in March 1944, Komoly's activities were intensified. The Zionists agreed that armed resistance was not a possibility in Hungary, and their actions should be targeted at ameliorating the situation of the community. Aware of the Allies' successes on both fronts against the Germans, gaining time became very important. Because of his status Ottó Komoly became the figure head in discussions with government ministers, politicians and leaders of the clergy. He refused at this stage to join the Judenrat (or JCC) set up by Eichmann. He refused an opportunity to claim places for his wife and himself to leave legally on the only train from Budapest.

In October 1944, after the German supported coup d'etat by the fascist Arrow Cross party, he was invited to become the head of the International Red Cross department 'A' in charge of helping abandoned and orphaned Jewish children. With the help of the embassies of Switzerland and other neutral countries, the Red Cross created 52 refuges, where about 5500 children and the 500 volunteers were ultimately saved from deportation and possible extermination. He also became the person responsible for contact with the Swiss representative, Saly Mayer, of the American Jewish Joint Distribution Committee (or JOINT) for channelling funds to this effort into Hungary. In conjunction with groups of young Zionists, he also provided food and medication for Jewish hospitals, old age homes and the Budapest ghetto.

On the political front, Komoly argued for the neutrality of Hungary in the war. He tried to influence the government using his military status and his connection with the son of Miklós Horthy. Under his leadership, the Aid and Rescue Committee organized non-Jewish protests against Nazi policies in Hungary, especially among the clergy and politicians. Following the establishment of the Budapest Ghetto, Komoly became a member of the Central Jewish Council (JCC) to extend his effectiveness.

On 1 January 1945, during the Siege of Budapest, Arrow Cross militia picked him up for questioning. Nothing else is known about him, and it is assumed that he was murdered by the fascists.

== Legacy ==
The B'nai B'rith World Center and KKL-JNF held a ceremony in Jerusalem , at its Martyr's Forest Scroll of Fire Plaza, on 8 April 2013 - Holocaust Martyrs and Heroes Remembrance Day - to commemorate the rescue activities of Ottó Komoly.

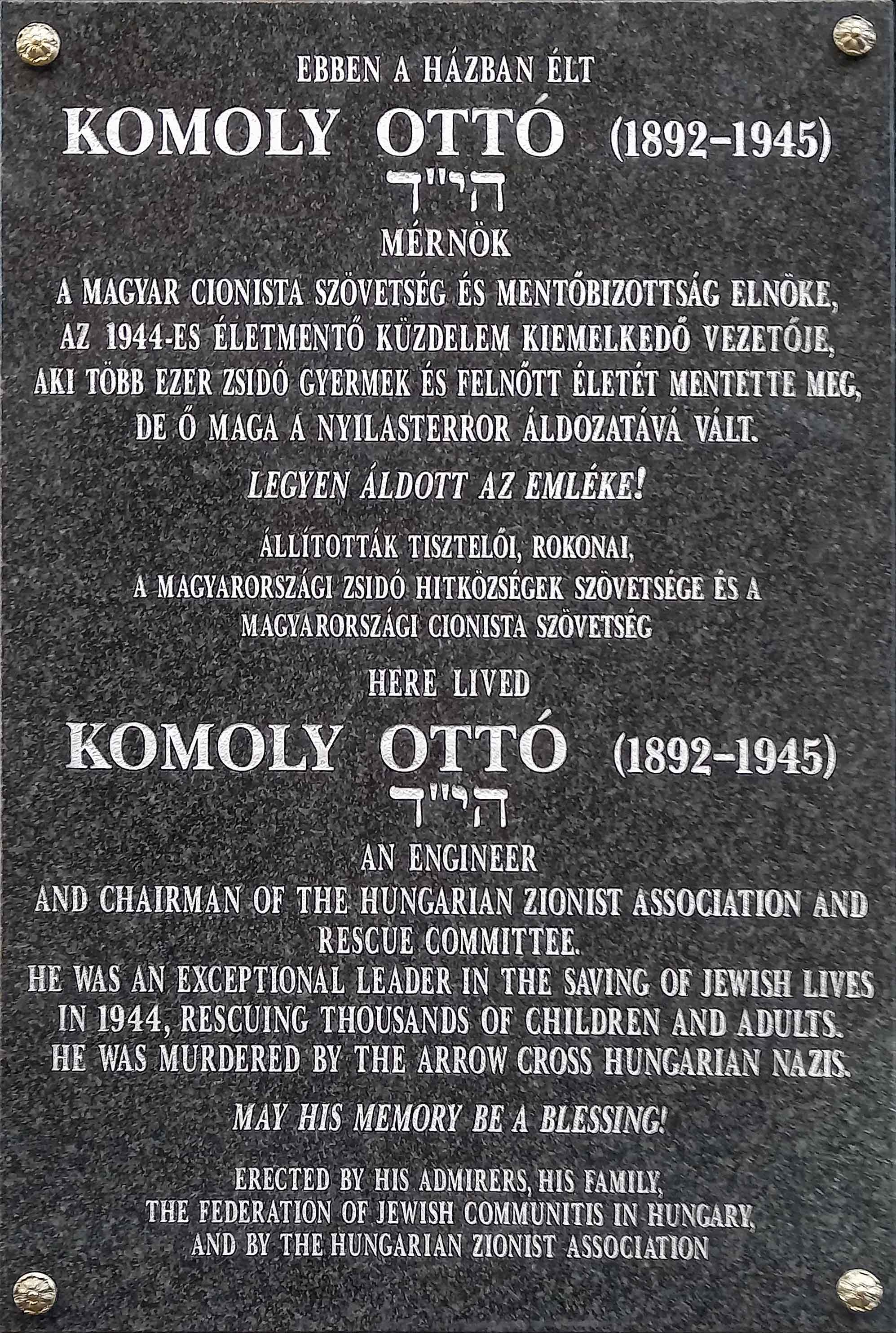

In his honor, a moshav in southern Israel - Yad Natan, is named after him. A number of towns in Israel have streets bearing his name. In Budapest, there are plaques commemorating him and his activities on the wall of his war-time apartment building, as well as at the Dohány Street Synagogue.

A conference and exhibition was held in 2023 at the Hungarian Holocaust Memorial Centre, and the latter can be viewed at the Centre (Soul Rescuers) or downloaded from their webpage.

Komoly received posthumously an award from the Hungarian government for his activities. His private diary of 1944, translated and annotated with over 500 references and contextual explanations is published
