= Alexander Weissberg-Cybulski =

Polish-Austrian physicist

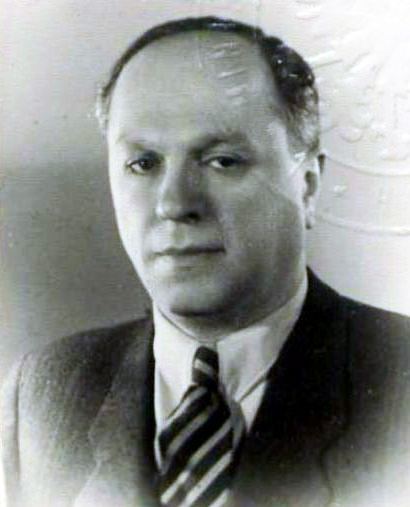
Alexander Weissberg-Cybulski in 1946

Alexander Weissberg-Cybulski (born October 8, 1901 – April 4, 1964) was a Polish-Austrian physicist, writer and businessman of Jewish descent. His testimony in the trial David Rousset vs. Les Lettres francaises and his book The Accused contributed significantly to spreading knowledge about Stalinist terror and show trials in Western Europe.

== Biography ==
Weissberg was born in 1901 in Kraków, to a Jewish family. His father was a businessman. The family moved to Vienna, where Weissberg studied and worked as a physicist.

Weissberg emigrated to the Soviet Union in 1931 to work as a physicist. He founded the Soviet Journal of Physics. In doing so he came to know Bukharin. It was this relationship with Bukharin that was later to become central to the regime's attempt to frame Weissberg as part of a conspiracy to assassinate Stalin. He was imprisoned for four years in the Soviet Union.

Weissberg was handed over to the Gestapo by Stalin as part of the prisoner exchange in the Nazi–Soviet pact (also known as the Molotov–Ribbentrop Pact) in 1939. Koestler's preface explains how the advocacy of fellow physicist Albert Einstein was instrumental in securing the Nazi release of Weissberg.

During World War II he changed his surname to Weissberg-Cybulski, taking the name of Graf Cybulski, his wife's first husband.

He died on April 4, 1964 in Paris ,.

== Writings ==
=== The Accused or Conspiracy of Silence ===
His book The Accused (1951) is also published under the title Conspiracy of Silence (Hamish Hamilton, London, 1952). The preface is by Weissberg's friend Arthur Koestler (awarded the Sonning Prize in 1968 for contribution to European culture). The book also included copies of letters which Einstein and Joliot-Curie sent to Stalin, requesting his release.

=== Advocate for the Dead ===
Weissberg also wrote a book titled Advocate for the Dead (Andre Deutsch, 1959). This book tells the story of Joel Brand and examines the working of the Jewish underground movement in Hungary and other places during the Second World War.
