= Paul Lawrence Rose =

Paul Lawrence Rose (26 February 1944 – December 2014) was the Professor of European History and Mitrani Professor of Jewish Studies at Pennsylvania State University. Rose specialized in the study of antisemitism, Germany history, European intellectual history, and Jewish history.

== Bibliography ==
- Rose, Paul Lawrence (1975). The Italian Renaissance of Mathematics. Librairie Droz. ISBN 978-2-600-03059-5.
- Rose, Paul Lawrence (1992). Wagner, Race and Revolution. Yale University Press. ISBN 0-300-05182-4.
- Rose, P.L. (2002). Heisenberg and the Nazi Atomic Bomb Project, 1939-1945: A Study in German Culture. University of California Press. ISBN 978-0-520-22926-6.
- Rose, Paul Lawrence (1990). German Question/Jewish Question: Revolutionary Antisemitism in Germany from Kant to Wagner. Princeton University Press. ISBN 978-0-691-00890-5. JSTOR j.ctt7zth13.
