= Hansi Brand =

Hungarian-born Zionist activist and rescue worker

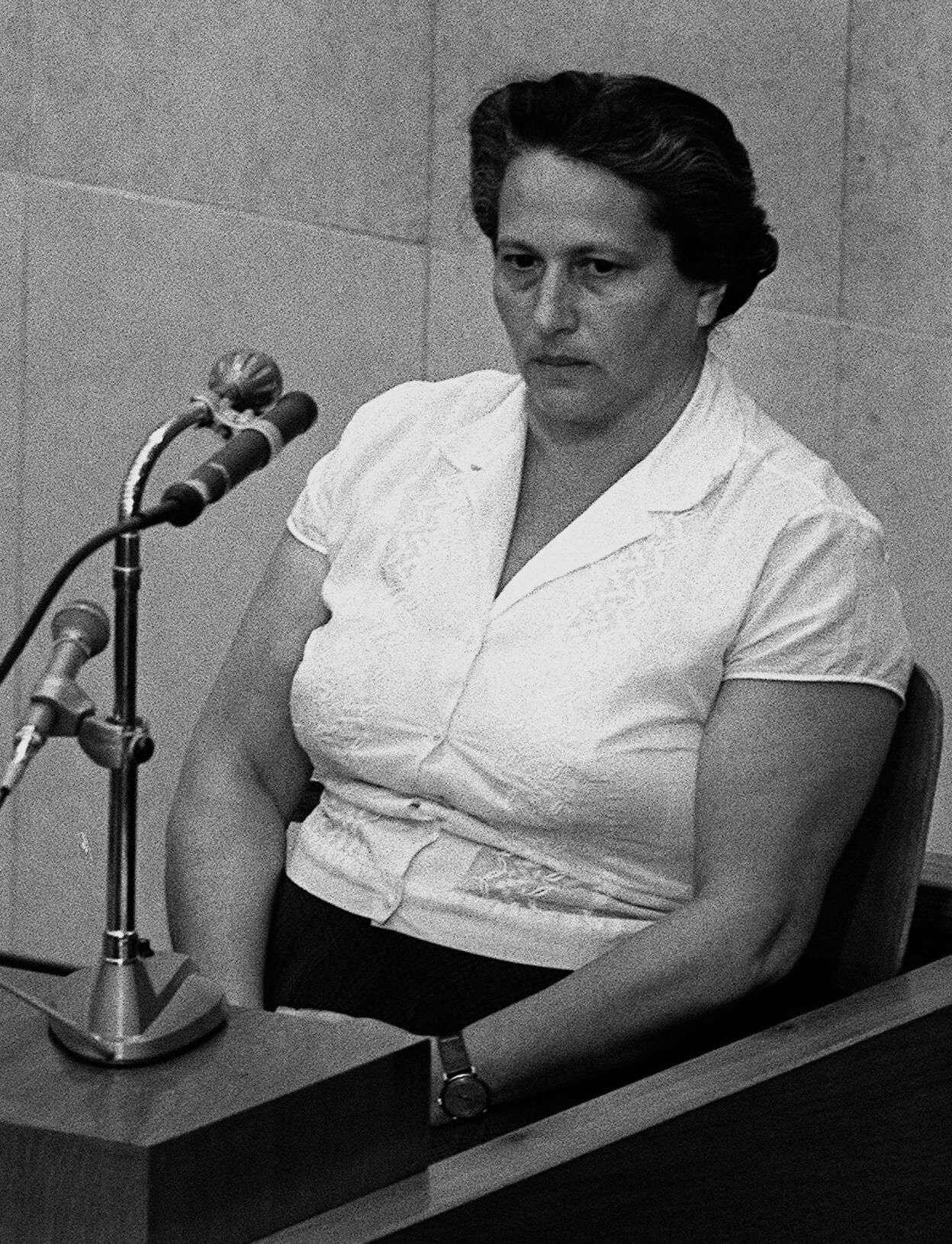
Hansi Brand during the Eichmann trial

Hajnalka "Hansi" Brand (née Hartmann; 26 August 1912 – 9 April 2000) was a Hungarian-born Zionist activist who was involved, as a member of the Budapest Aid and Rescue Committee, in efforts to rescue Jews during the Holocaust.

== Early life ==
Brand was born in Budapest (then Austria-Hungary) in 1912. She was educated there and joined a Zionist youth movement when she was in high school. Later on, she joined a pioneering village which taught young Jews "agricultural training prior to their immigration to Palestine." In 1935 she married Joel Brand ("a prominent member of the World Union of Mapai") in Budapest in a fictitious marriage to allow them to immigrate to Palestine. Later on the marriage became a "real" one. They established a small glove factory and had two sons, one of whom died young.

== Rescue operations ==
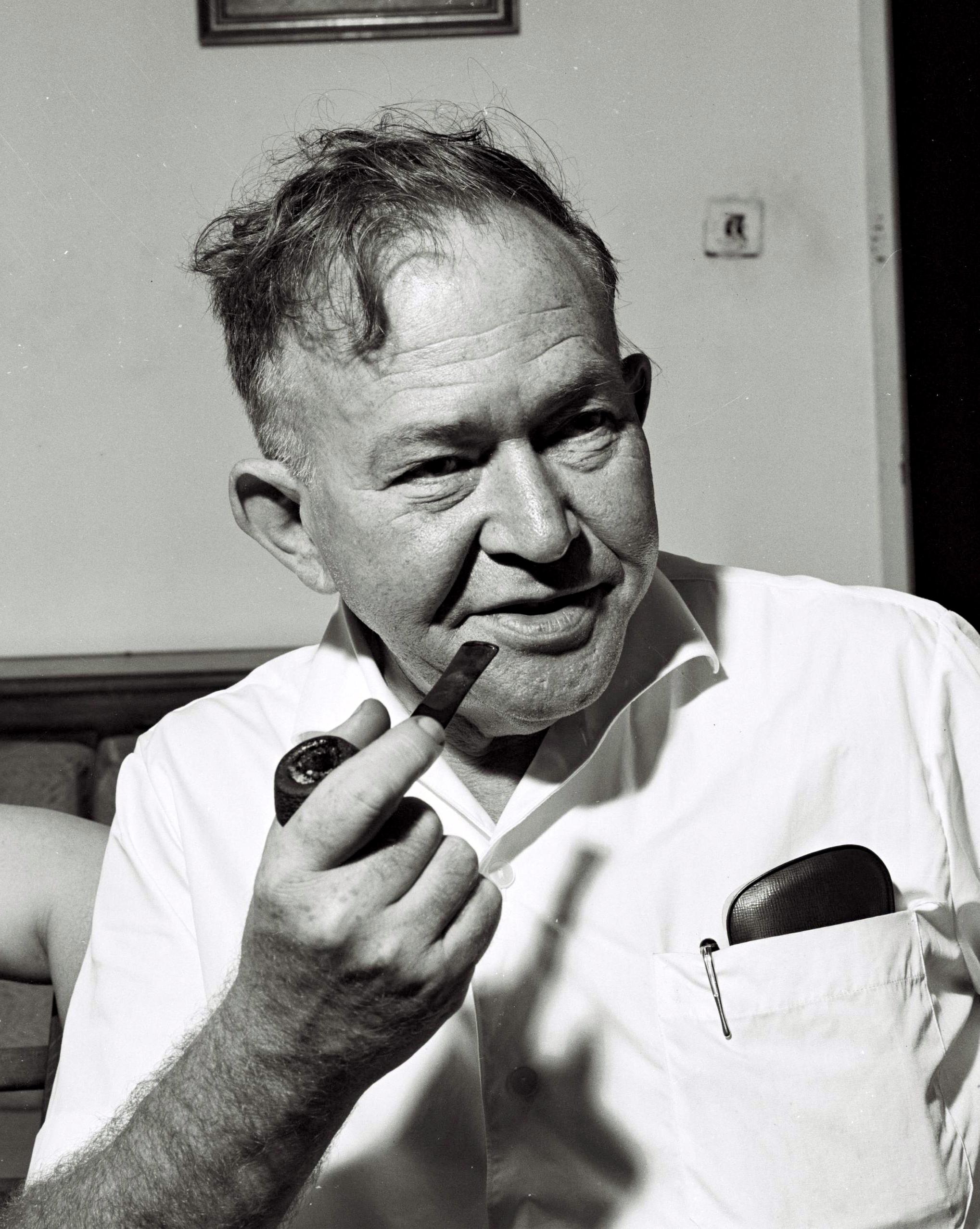
Hansi's husband, Joel Brand

Between 1938 and 1945, Brand and her husband were deeply involved in efforts to help Jewish refugees who had escaped to Hungary, which did not deport Jews to concentration camps before the Nazi invasion in 1944. They saved her sister and family from being sent to Nazi concentration camps after they had been deported to Poland in 1941. They accomplished this by bribing Hungarian intelligence officer Jozef Krem. Together with some other Hungarian Zionist activists, the couple founded the Aid and Rescue Committee in 1942.

Hansi and Joel Brand were key associates in the Kasztner negotiations with the Nazis. The central part of the deal with Eichmann was the so-called "Goods for Blood" arrangement in which the Nazis tried to barter Jewish lives for money, arms and supplies in the dying months of the war.

Joel Brand was dispatched to Istanbul to persuade the Jewish Agency leadership to accept this plan, which came to nothing. The Zionist leaders told him that Moshe Sharett—then head of the Agency's political department, and later, Israel's second prime minister—could not obtain a visa for Istanbul and that a meeting could only take place in Aleppo. Within moments of leaving the train to Aleppo, Joel Brand was arrested by the British. Back in Budapest, Kasztner had begun an affair with Hansi Brand.

Hansi Brand and the other committee members tried negotiating with Adolf Eichmann to save (at least some) Hungarian Jews from the Holocaust. Brand and Rudolf Kastner were able to get 1,685 Jews to leave Hungary and go to neutral Switzerland on the Kastner train. In addition, working with the Aid and Rescue Committee, she saved the lives of additional Jews by getting 15,000 of them deported to Strasshof concentration camp (where they had a much greater chance of surviving) than to Auschwitz. Finally, she also tried to save the lives of some Hungarian Jewish children whom the Nazis forced on a "Death March" in November 1944.

== Later life ==
Brand moved from Budapest to Switzerland in 1946, and from there to Palestine in 1947. In December 1946, in Basel, Switzerland, she testified in front of a special committee dealing with Rudolf Kastner's activity during the Holocaust in Hungary. She also testified in the Kastner trial in 1954 and in the Eichmann trial in 1961.

In her final years, Brand worked at the Michlelet Tel Aviv college and on behalf of orphans and Ethiopian immigrants. Her husband, Joel, died at the age of 58 in 1964. Hansi Brand died in Tel Aviv, Israel in 2000. She was survived by her son, Daniel.

== Published works ==
- In 1960, Brand wrote Satan and the Soul about the couple's activities during the Holocaust and the Kastner trial.
