= Aid and Rescue Committee =

Small committee of Zionists based in Budapest in 1944–45

The Aid and Rescue Committee, or Va'adat Ha-Ezrah ve-ha-Hatzalah be-Budapesht (Vaada for short; name in Hebrew: ועדת העזרה וההצלה בבודפשט) was a small committee of Zionists in Budapest, Hungary, in 1944–1945, who helped Hungarian Jews escape the Holocaust during the German occupation of that country. The Committee was also known as the Rescue and Relief Committee, and the Budapest Rescue Committee.

The main personalities of the Vaada were Ottó Komoly, president; Rudolf Kasztner, executive vice-president; Samuel Springmann, treasurer; and Joel Brand, who was in charge of tijul or the underground rescue of Jews. Other members were Hansi Brand (Joel Brand's wife); Ernő Szilágyi from the left-wing Hashomer Hatzair; Peretz Revesz; Andras Biss; and Niszon Kahan. After the German occupation in March 1944 responsibilities were split: Otto Komoly became mainly in charge of dealing with Hungarian government, military and police figures (the so-called 'line A'), while Kasztner (after Brand's departure to Istanbul) led the negotiations with the Germans (the so-called 'line B') including Adolf Eichmann.

== See also ==
- History of the Jews in Hungary
- Kastner train
- Kurt Becher
