= Randolph L. Braham =

American historian and political scientist

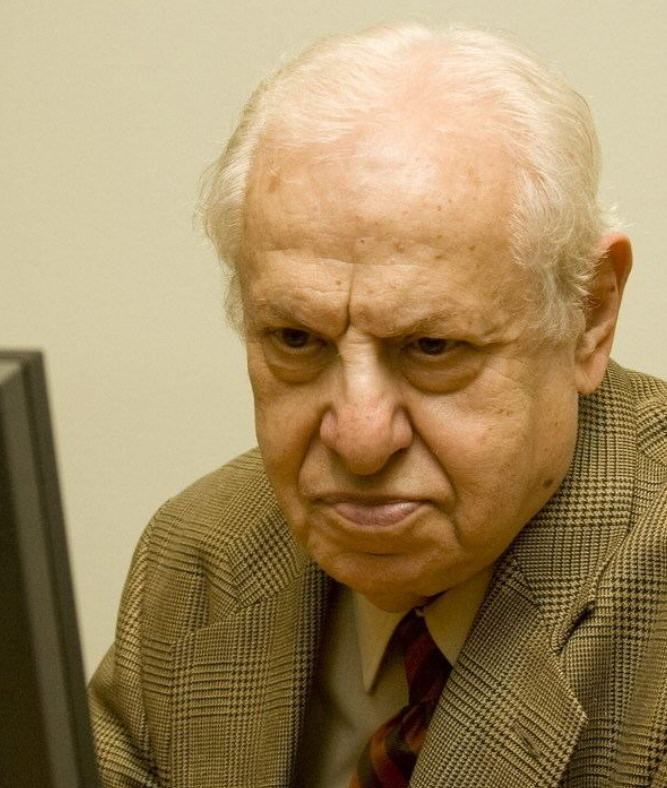
- Born: Adolf Ábrahám; December 20, 1922; Bucharest, Romania
- Died: November 25, 2018 (aged 95); New York City, U.S.
- Education: The City College of New York; The New School for Social Research
- Known for: Specialist in comparative politics and Holocaust studies
- Awards: Jewish National Book Award (two times), Order of Merit Officer's Cross of the Hungarian Republic, Medium Cross of the Hungarian Republic (returned), Order of the Star of Romania (returned), Order of Cultural Merit of Romania, Pro Cultura Hungarica award
- Scientific career
- Fields: History and political science
- Workplaces: City College, The Graduate Center of The City University of New York

Randolph Lewis Braham (December 20, 1922 – November 25, 2018) was an American historian and political scientist, born in Romania, Distinguished Professor Emeritus of Political Science at the City College and The Graduate Center of the City University of New York. A specialist in comparative politics and the Holocaust, he was a founding board member of the academic committee of the United States Holocaust Memorial Museum (USHMM), Washington, D.C., and founded The Rosenthal Institute for Holocaust Studies at the Graduate Center in 1979.

Braham's career was spent teaching comparative politics and Soviet studies at The City College of New York, where he chaired the political science department. He was the author or editor of over 60 books, authored or co-authored chapters in 50 others, and published a large number of scholarly articles. The vast majority of his published work deals with the Holocaust in Hungary. He became best known for his two-volume work The Politics of Genocide: The Holocaust in Hungary, first published in 1981.

== Early life and education ==
=== Background ===
Born to a Jewish family in Bucharest (as Adolf Ábrahám, with the Hebrew name Avraham ben Itzhak ben Aryeh), the son of Lajos Ábrahám and Eszter Katz, Braham was raised in extreme poverty in Dej, a historically Hungarian small town in Transylvania. He spent 1943–1945 in the so-called Labor service of the Hungarian army in the Ukraine, slave-labor units of military-age Jews who ordinarily were murdered after major campaigns or before retreats. During the chaotic Hungarian collapse to the Soviets, Braham escaped and traveled homewards secretly through German-occupied Hungary.

During his escape to the West, in the Hungarian village of Nyíri, he and four others were rescued from the Hungarian gendarmerie (working as an arm of the SS) by a Christian farmer, István Novák (d. 1983), who in 1985 was honored by Yad Vashem in Israel as Righteous Among the Nations. Never once in any of his published writings, until his 2014 open letter to the Hungarian community rejecting his honors from the Hungarian government, did Braham reveal that he himself was a survivor. In his magnum opus The Politics of Genocide, he did use as a photo illustration—perhaps the only one without a source reference—a photograph of his own dog tag.

In his oral testimony (1997) for the USC Shoah Foundation project, he describes inter alia the ordeals of his unit during the final year and winter on the Russian front attached to the Hungarian Army. These include the frequent hangings and tortures and that some of the men during that winter were reduced to marching barefoot and naked covered by only a blanket, defecating while walking. He also described how, during Army maneuvers, he and the other Jews were placed face down in rows in otherwise impassable swamps, for the troops and horse-drawn carriages and horse-drawn artillery to ride over.

=== Move to America ===
After arriving in the American Zone in Berlin, Braham served as a translator for the U.S. Army. His extended family was murdered in Auschwitz, with the exception of his older sister, who was a prisoner there but survived. Braham emigrated to America in early 1948. Although forbidden as a Jew by the pre-World War II Hungarian government to attend Gymnasium (high school), he received a B.Sci. in economics and government from The City College of New York later that year, a M.Sci. in education from City College (the education school has since moved) in 1949, and a Ph.D. in political science from The New School for Social Research in 1952. The next year he became an American citizen, changed his first and last names and adopted his father's name Lewis (occasionally cited incorrectly spelled "Louis").

== Career and research ==
=== Positions held ===
Braham began his teaching career at CUNY in 1962 at The City College of New York, chaired the political science department there, and became a distinguished professor (CUNY's highest rank) in April 1987. He retired from active teaching in September 1992 and began his residence as professor emeritus at the Graduate Center of the City University of New York.

Braham was a member of the Academic Committee of the United States Holocaust Memorial Museum, Washington, D.C., from the Museum's earliest planning through May 2005 and participated in the Academic Committee's Fellowship Subcommittee from its inception in 1999; he also was a special advisor for the Museum of Jewish Heritage, New York and for Yad Vashem. His works were used as major source books by courts of law in various countries, including Canada, Germany, Israel, and the United States in cases involving restitution and war crimes. Braham's memoirs, concluded in 2013, are on deposit at his archives at the United States Holocaust Memorial Museum (USHMM). Included there are notable accounts of the difficult ways with which historians of the Holocaust have dealt with Soviet-bloc states and others unwilling to provide or hiding documentary evidence.

=== Writing and lecturing ===
In 1990, as reported in the Washington Post, when appearing before the jury in the war-crimes trial of Imre Finta, a Hungarian gendarmerie commander, Braham testified, My function is to pursue the truth ... I try to comprehend the incomprehensible. And in 2014, in his open letter when returning his Hungarian honors, Braham wrote: As a survivor whose parents and many family members were among the hundreds of thousands of murdered Jews, [I] cannot remain silent ... It was my destiny to work on the preservation of the historical record of the Holocaust.

In the 1998 Oscar-winning Academy Award for Documentary Feature The Last Days, Braham provided contextual overviews of the Hungarian Holocaust. He was the subject of the documentary Rémálmok nyomában, which is available in an English version titled Retracing a Nightmare.

In January 2014, in a widely published open letter on what he saw as increasing attempts by Hungary's rightist Orbán government to falsify history and whitewash the Horthy era, Braham returned his medals and resigned from the Order of Merit of the Republic of Hungary, and forbade using his name in connection with the Holocaust Memorial Center in Budapest after excessive government interference. Previously, in 2005, he resigned from the Order of the Star of Romania, after a noted rightist was honored with membership.

Nobelist Elie Wiesel, also a survivor of the Hungarian holocaust and a long-time colleague of Braham, concluded his foreword to Braham's 2013 geographical encyclopedia stating, To recommend this work to teachers, their students, and researchers is more than an act of friendship. It is the duty of remembrance that belongs to the realm of the sacred. In 2017 Braham gave his last lecture in Budapest, and two months before his death published an open letter on the recent Hungarian government decision to construct a "competing" Holocaust museum.

Two nights before his brief final hospitalization in 2018 for heart failure, Braham was actively writing revisions to his recent work, yet reluctantly had to cancel his farewell address —The Struggle between the History and Collective Memory of the Twentieth Century: The Holocaust vs. Communism — scheduled the next day at the Rosenthal Institute he founded 39 years previously.

== Awards ==
His two-volume The Politics of Genocide: The Holocaust in Hungary won the 1981 National Jewish Book Award (USA) in the Holocaust category. It earned him citations in the New York State Assembly (1981) and the Congressional Record (1981, 1994, 2004). Its most recent expanded revision appeared in 2016.

In 2013, Braham received the National Jewish Book Award in the Holocaust category for his three-volume The Geographical Encyclopedia of the Holocaust in Hungary.

Among his other honors are the Order of Merit Officer's Cross of the Republic of Hungary (1995), the Pro Cultura Hungarica award of the Hungarian Ministry of Culture (2002), the Science for Society award of the Hungarian Academy of Science (2004), the Order of the Star of Romania, Officer Rank, of the Romanian Republic (2004; returned in 2005), the Order of Cultural Merit of Romania, Commander Rank, and the Medium Cross of the Republic of Hungary (2011; returned in 2014).

== Selected works ==
- 1963: The Destruction of Hungarian Jewry: A Documentary Account (New York: Pro Arte, 2 vol.).
- 1977: The Hungarian Labor Service System, 1939-1945 (New York: Distributed by Columbia University Press).
- 1981 (2016): The Politics of Genocide: The Holocaust in Hungary (New York: Columbia University Press, 2 vol.; 2nd ed. 1994; Boulder, CO: Social Science Monographs, 3rd ed. 2016).
- 1997 (2015): A népirtás politikája: A holocaust magyarországon [The Politics of Genocide: The Holocaust in Hungary] (Budapest: Belvárosi Könyvkiadó, 2 vol.; 3rd ed. 2015).
- 1997: (with Attila Pók) The Holocaust in Hungary: Fifty Years Later (New York: Distributed by Columbia University Press).
- 2001-2014: Tanulmányok a holokausztról, Vol. I-VII [Studies on the Holocaust, 7 vol] [Budapest: Balassi Kiadó, 2001, 2002, 2004, 2006]; (Budapest: Múlt és Jövő, 2014).
- 2006: (with Brewster S. Chamberlin) The Holocaust in Hungary: Sixty Years Later (New York: Distributed by Columbia University Press).
- 2007: (with Zoltán Tibori Szabó) A magyarországi holokauszt földrajzi enciklopédiája [The Geographical Encyclopedia of the Holocaust in Hungary] (Budapest: Park Könyvkiadó, 3 vol.).
- 2008: (with Zoltán Tibori Szabó) Az észak-erdélyi holokauszt földrajzi enciklopédiája [The Geographical Encyclopedia of the Holocaust in Northern Transylvania] (Budapest: Park Könyvkiadó; Cluj-Napoca: Koinónia).
- 2011: (with William J. vanden Heuvel). The Auschwitz Reports and the Holocaust in Hungary (New York: Distributed by Columbia University Press).
- 2011: Bibliography of the Holocaust in Hungary (New York: Distributed by Columbia University Press).
- 2013: (with Zoltán Tibori Szabó) The Geographical Encyclopedia of the Holocaust in Hungary (Evanston, IL: Northwestern University Press in association with the United States Holocaust Memorial Museum and the Rosenthal Institute for Holocaust Studies), 3 vol.
- 2015: "Magyarország: Hadjárat a holokauszt történelmi emlékezete ellen," A holokauszt Magyarországon: hetven év múltán Randolph L. Braham and András Kovács, eds. (Budapest: Múlt és Jövő), pp. 229–261 (In English: "Hungary: The Assault on the Historical Memory of the Holocaust," The Holocaust in Hungary: Seventy Years Later Randolph L. Braham and András Kovács, eds. (Budapest: Central European University, 2016).
- 2019: (with Zoltán Tibori Szabó) Enciclopedia geografică a Holocaustului din Transilvania de Nord [The Geographical Encyclopedia of the Holocaust in Northern Transylvania] (Bucharest: Elie Wiesen National Institute for the Study of the Holocaust in Romania; Kishinev: Cartier).
