= Oskar Neumann =

Czech lawyer and writer

Jirmejahu Oskar Neumann (1894–1981), also known as Oscar Neumann, was a Czech lawyer and writer. From December 1943, during the Holocaust, he served as president of the Slovak Judenrat (Jewish Council or Ústredňa Židov).

== Activism ==
Neumann was born in 1894 in Most, Bohemia, Austria-Hungary (now the Czech Republic). He lived in Bratislava for several decades. Initially the Judenrat's head of retraining, Neumann used his position to help the country's Zionist youth movement, according to Yehuda Bauer. He became part of the Judenrat's underground resistance, the Working Group, and when that was disbanded, in the sense that its work was merged with that of the Judenrat in general, he served as the Judenrat's president.

In April 1944 Neumann was one of the Judenrat leaders who interviewed Rudolf Vrba and Alfred Wetzler, Slovak Jews who escaped to Bratislava from the Auschwitz concentration camp in occupied Poland. The men carried with them detailed information about the gas chambers and mass murders in the camp. The report compiled by the escapees and the Judenrat became known as the Vrba–Wetzler report. Neumann himself was sent to the Theresienstadt concentration camp; he was released in May 1945.

== Im Schatten des Todes ==
Neumann was the author of a postwar memoir, Im Schatten des Todes: Ein Tatsachenbericht vom Schicksalskampf des slovakischen Judentums ("In the shadow of death: A report on Slovak Jewry's battle with fate"), which was published in German and Hebrew in Israel in 1956. He dedicated the book to his mother, Friederike Neumann; his in-laws, Isidor and Julie Knoepfelmacher; Gisi Fleischmann, leader of the Bratislava Working Group; and the 70,000 martyrs of Slovak Jewry who died in the camps and gas chambers.

The Holocaust historian Raul Hilberg alleged that the failure to translate Neumann's book into English could be traced to the taboo of examining the activity of Jewish Councils during the Holocaust. Hilberg argued that they "became a German tool". He wrote of Neumann's book: "Take another taboo: Jewish Councils. In Israel, a publisher in Tel Aviv had in his possession a memoir, four hundred pages long, written by Oskar Neumann. The only such memoir that exists—to my knowledge—of one of the chiefs of the Slovak Judenrat, the Ústredňa Židov. That book was published in German. It was published in Hebrew. But never in English. English-language publishers refused the request to translate and publish this book."

== After the war ==
After the war, Neumann became the chair of the Histadrut (the socialist Zionist labour movement) in Czechoslovakia. He emigrated to Palestine in 1946, where he led the Association of Czechoslovak Immigrants. He died in 1981 in Be'er Tuvia, Israel.

== Selected works ==
- (1956). Im Schatten des Todes: Ein Tatsachenbericht vom Schicksalskampf des slovakischen Judentums. Tel Aviv: Edition 'Olamenu'. OCLC 2587140
- (1970). Gisi Fleishmann: The Story of a Heroic Woman. Tel Aviv: World (WIZO) Department of Organization and Education. OCLC 858202
