= Gisi Fleischmann =

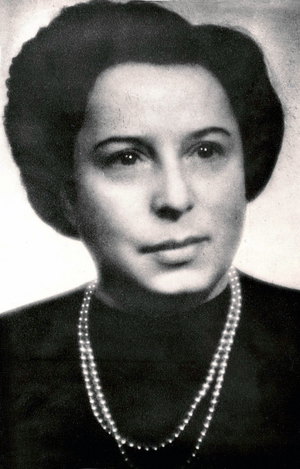
- Born: Gisela Fischer; 21 January 1892; Pozsony, Kingdom of Hungary, Austria-Hungary
- Died: 18 October 1944 (aged 52); Auschwitz-Birkenau, Nazi German
- Occupation: Zionist activist
- Known for: Attempting to save Slovak Jews as the leader of the Bratislava Working Group
- Children: Aliza and Yehudit Fleischmann

Gisi Fleischmann (Slovak: Gizela Fleischmannová; 21 January 1892 – 18 October 1944) was a Zionist activist and the leader of the Bratislava Working Group, one of the best known Jewish rescue groups during the Holocaust. Fleischmann was arrested on 15 October 1944 and was murdered in the Auschwitz concentration camp three days later.

== Life ==
Fleischmann was born on 21 January 1892 in Pozsony, Kingdom of Hungary, Austria-Hungary (today Bratislava, Slovakia). She worked for a number of Jewish organizations. She founded the Slovakia chapter of the Women's International Zionist Organization and served on the executive committee of Histadrut in Slovakia. She was also a representative of the Joint Distribution Committee.

On 4 September 1939, her brother, the lawyer Gustav Fischer, was beaten to death in Bratislava. His wife, Lili, committed suicide shortly thereafter.

== The Holocaust ==
At Rabbi Weissmandl's initiative, the Working Group was also responsible for the ambitious but ill-fated Europa Plan which would have seen large numbers of European Jews rescued from the Nazi and Fascist murderers. An agreement was negotiated with the Nazis in late 1942 and one to two million dollars ransom was required to stop most transports. The Germans asked for a 10% down payment. As part of Gisi Fleischmann's duties, she met several times in Hungary with Jewish leaders, and also attempted to enlist support from Saly Mayer, the Swiss representative of the JOINT (Joint Distribution Committee), and Hechalutz representatives in order to raise money to pay the ransom. Nothing came of it, reportedly because Sally Mayer was unwilling to provide the down-payment since currency transfer to Nazis was illegal. Another opinion is that Heinrich Himmler intervened in August 1943. Unfortunately, the down payment was never made.

The Working Group also played a central role in the distribution of the Auschwitz Report in spring of 1944 written by Slovak Jews Rudolf Vrba and Alfred Wetzler. Rabbi Weissmandl's version ultimately reached George Mantello in Switzerland via Budapest. He immediately published the report's summary. That triggered a major Swiss grass-roots protest in the Swiss press, churches and streets. It was a major factor leading to President Roosevelt, Winston Churchill and others threatening Hungary's regent Horthy with post-war retribution if he did not immediately stop the transports. This significantly influenced Horthy to stop the transports. At the time, about 12,000 Jews per day were transported from Hungary to Auschwitz. Consequently, Raoul Wallenberg was able to go to Budapest, where he and diplomats like Carl Lutz, Angelo Rotta, and others rescued large numbers of Jews.

== Death and legacy ==
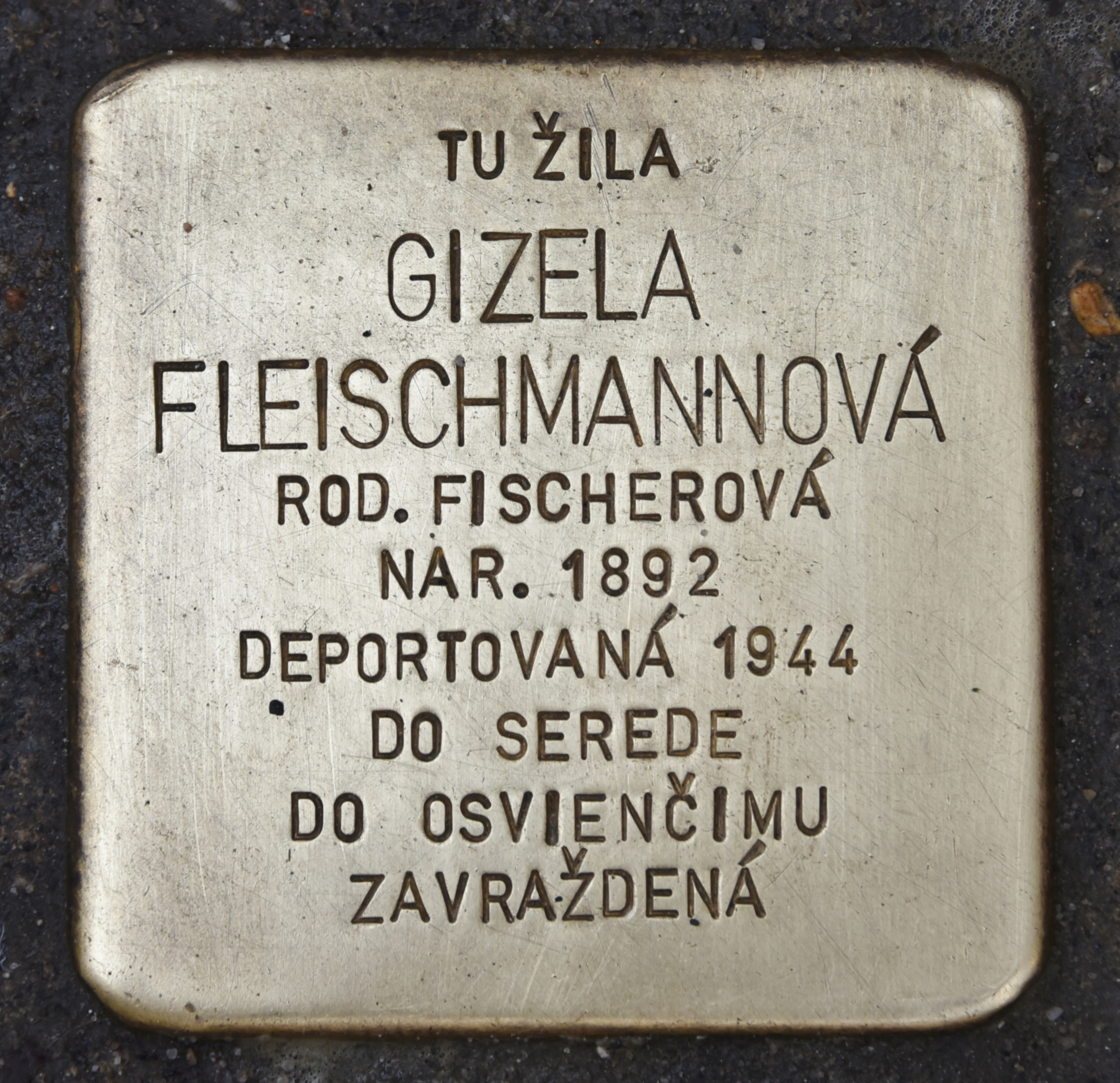
Stolperstein for Fleischmann

Following the Slovak National Uprising of August - October 1944, the Germans invaded Slovakia and deported the remaining Jews. The Working Group was unable to bribe or negotiate with the German military authorities, and a massive roundup on the night of 28 September caught 1,800 Jews in Bratislava, including most of the Working Group's leadership. Fleischmann was not arrested, and continued to help Jews until she was deported on the last transport to Auschwitz on 17 October. Designated "return unwanted," she was probably murdered upon arrival.

Gideon Hausner, prosecutor at the Eichmann trial, said that "Fleischmann's name deserves to be immortalized in the annals of our people, and her memory should be bequeathed to further generations as a radiant example of heroism and of boundless devotion."

== Sources ==
- Fuchs, Dr. Abraham (1984). The Unheeded Cry (also in Hebrew as Karati V'ein Oneh). Mesorah Publications.
- Hecht, Ben. Perfidy (also in Hebrew as Kachas)
- Kranzler, Dr. David. Thy Brother's Blood
- Fatran, Gila. The "Working Group", Holocaust and Genocide Studies, 8:2 (1994:Fall) 164–201; also see correspondence in issue 9:2 (1995:Fall) 269-276
- VERAfilm (Prague), Among Blind Fools (documentary video)
- VERAfilm - Projects
- Nešťáková, Denisa (2017). Gisi Fleischmann – przywódczyni Żydów na Słowacji podczas II wojnyświatowej. In. Elity i przedstawiciele społeczności żydowskiej podczas II wojny światowej. Warszawa. pp. 473–489.
- The Rescuers by David Ben Reuven (song) - YouTube
