= Tibor Kováč =

Tibor Kováč (1905–1952) was an activist in the illegal Working Group resistance organization during the Holocaust in Slovakia; he also worked for the welfare department of the Ústredňa Židov (ÚŽ), the Judenrat in the Slovak State.

During the deportations from Slovakia in 1942, Kováč served on the Department of Appeals at the ÚŽ, which was set up to help Jews gain exceptions and ensure that those issued would be honored. It is unclear how effective this department was in saving Jews from deportation. The Working Group also attempted to bribe Slovak officials in order to halt the deportations. One of its targets was Anton Vašek, head of the Ministry of the Interior department responsible for implementing the deportations. Because he was Vašek's former classmate, Kováč was given the responsibility of negotiating with him. He visited Vašek's office almost daily to deliver bribes and provide Vašek with excuses to explain delays in deportations to his superiors. Due to Vašek's intervention, a 26 June transport of Jews was cancelled; Vašek presented Interior Minister Alexander Mach with a falsified report that all non-exempt Jews had already been deported. Mach was skeptical about the report, however, and the deportations resumed in July.

On 28 August 1944, the Germans invaded Slovakia, triggering the Slovak National Uprising. Kováč remained in Bratislava while his group attempted to negotiate with the Nazis. On 28 September, Kováč and another Working Group activist, Michael Dov Weissmandl, were summoned to the office of their negotiating partner, SS officer Alois Brunner, who arrested them. Kováč and Weissmandl witnessed the use of stolen lists of Jews to prepare for a massive roundup that evening; 1,800 Jews in Bratislava were captured. Kováč was allowed to remain in Bratislava after the roundup along with another colleague, Gisi Fleischmann. Fleischmann was arrested by the SS on 15 October and killed at Auschwitz concentration camp, but Kováč managed to go into hiding and survived the war. He served as the main witness for the prosecution during Vašek's trial for his participation in the Holocaust. Philosophically, Kováč was an assimilationist and decided to remain in Czechoslovakia after the Soviet takeover. He was harassed by the secret police, which led him to commit suicide in 1952.
