= Koso affair =

Bribery scandal in 1943 Slovakia

The Koso affair was a bribery scandal involving Isidor Koso, the head of the prime minister's office of the Slovak State. An illegal Jewish organization called the Working Group had been bribing Koso's wife, Žofia Kosova, by paying her son's tuition at a private school in Switzerland. Kosova was arrested at the Swiss border in late October 1943 with 5,000 Swiss francs from the Working Group and a letter from Fleischmann to Saly Mayer, the JDC representative in Switzerland, asking him for another 45,000 Swiss francs. Fleischmann and several other ÚŽ employees were arrested. Extremists in the Slovak government attacked those seen as soft on the Jews, and Koso was dismissed.
