= Jerzy Tabeau =

Polish Auschwitz escapee (1918–2002)

Jerzy Tabeau (18 December 1918 – 11 May 2002), an imprisoned Polish medical student, was one of the first escapees from Auschwitz to give a detailed report to the outside world on the genocide occurring there. First reports in early 1942 had been made by the Polish officer Witold Pilecki. Zabłotów-born Tabeau's report was known as that of the "Polish major" in the Auschwitz Protocols. After the war, he became a noted cardiologist in Kraków.

Tabeau was a member of the Union of Armed Struggle, Związek Walki Zbrojnej (ZWZ) and had worked in the Polish underground under the pseudonym "Jerzy Wesołowski" in Kraków, distributing underground press. He was captured and taken to the Gestapo's Montelupich Prison in Kraków. On 25 March 1942, he was transferred to Auschwitz, and - still under his false name - registered under the number 27273. He soon fell ill with pneumonia and pleurisy, and was placed in the camp hospital. After recovering, he joined the hospital staff as a nurse. In the summer of 1942 he came down with typhus and was selected by Nazi doctor Dr. Josef Klehr to be included in the list of patients to be killed in the gas chambers. However, thanks to an intervention by the Polish block elder, Alfred Stossel, he managed to escape death.

Tabeau escaped with another Polish inmate, Roman Cieliczko, on 19 November 1943. The escape was pre-planned in July 1943 and originally intended to include five prisoners escaping. As Cieliczko was in the camp under his given name, not a pseudonym, it was essential to first warn Cieliczko's mother in Zakopane to go into hiding. Escapees' relatives were often captured in reprisal. On 14 July 1943, a message was sent to Cieliczko's mother to go into hiding. Tabeau and Cieliczko escaped by cutting through the camp's wire fence. They made their way to the village of Goczałkowice where local Resistance welcomed them, then continued on to Zakopane and stayed with friends of Cieliczko. Tabeau boarded a freight train to Kraków, while Cieliczko joined a partisan unit but was killed by German troops in a sabotage operation three months later. Tabeau contacted Teresa Lasocka-Estreicher, and later joined the underground Kraków PPS. In December 1943, Tabeau proceeded to prepare a report about the camp. The work was completed in early 1944.

In March, on the orders of the Underground, he left Kraków on a mission to London to give testimony in person about the Polish resistance and confirm to the Allies the truth about the Nazi genocide. The journey took place without incident. After returning to Poland, he went to the Nowy Sącz area to form a "Socialist Death Battalion." During one of the battles near Jordanów in October 1944, Tabeau was wounded in the head, leaving him partially paralysed. However, he lived to see the end of the war. After 1945, he settled in Kraków, completing his medical studies and graduating from the Jagiellonian University. He became an assistant professor of medicine, and a well-known cardiologist in Kraków.

== Tabeau's report ==
Reports of the German genocide were emerging, including the 10 December 1942 address by the Polish Government in Exile to the League of Nations, and evidence from escaped Jewish inmate from Majdanek, Dionys Lenard. However, as yet there was limited information about the conveyor-belt of death at Auschwitz.

Tabeau compiled his report between December 1943 and January 1944. It was copied using a stencil machine in Geneva in August 1944, and was distributed by the Polish government-in-exile and the Bratislava Working Group, reaching Czechoslovak diplomat Jaromír Kopecký in Switzerland. This was eventually included in the Auschwitz Protocols as the 17-page "No 2. Transport "The Polish Major's Report". The contents of the Protocols was discussed in detail by The New York Times on 26 November 1944.

== Other eyewitness reports ==
Several escapees from the camp had already passed on information to the outside: On 20 June 1942 three Poles Kazimierz Piechowski, Stanisław Gustaw Jaster, Józef Lempart and the Ukrainian Eugeniusz Bendera escaped, with a report by Witold Pilecki passing his information to the Polish Home Army (AK). On 27 April 1943 Witold Pilecki himself, a Polish Home Army agent who had deliberately infiltrated the camp in order to found Związek Organizacji Wojskowej (ZOW) cells inside it and to take measures against the German extermination policy of the Polish intelligentsia, escaped together with two other Polish soldiers, Jan Redzej and Edward Ciesielski. Each compiled a separate report for the Polish Home Army. Witold's report was translated into English but was filed away by the British government with a note appended stating there was no indication as to the source's reliability.

On 2 November 1943 Kazimirez Halori, another Polish prisoner, escaped and passed information to the Polish Socialist Party. Natalia Zarembina assembled testimony from another Polish escaper and others into a report entitled "Auschwitz—Camp of Death" which was published in English in 1943 in London.
