= Armin Frieder =

Slovak rabbi

Abraham Armin Frieder
- Title: Chief Rabbi of Slovakia

Personal life
- Born: 30 June 1911 Privigye, Austria-Hungary
- Died: 21 June 1946 (aged 34) Bratislava, Czechoslovakia
- Spouse: Ružena Berl
- Children: Gideon Frieder

Religious life
- Religion: Judaism
- Denomination: Neolog Judaism
- Synagogue: Nové Mesto nad Váhom
- Position: Rabbi
- Organisation: Yeshurun (Neolog communities of Slovakia)
- Other: Working Group

Abraham Armin Frieder (30 June 1911 – 21 June 1946) was a Slovak Neolog rabbi. After attending several yeshivas, he was ordained in 1932 and became the leader of Slovak Neolog communities before Slovakia declared independence in 1939 and began to oppress its Jewish population. Frieder joined the Working Group, a Jewish resistance organization, and delivered a petition to President Jozef Tiso begging him to halt deportations of Jews to Poland. Frieder was involved in efforts to send relief to deportees and interview escapees to learn about the progress of the Holocaust in Poland. After the German invasion of Slovakia during the Slovak National Uprising, deportations from Slovakia resumed; Frieder was captured but managed to avoid deportation from Sereď concentration camp. After the war, he was appointed Chief Rabbi of Slovakia and attempted to smooth tensions between Neolog and Orthodox Jews. He died after surgery in 1946.

== Early life ==
Frieder was born on 30 June 1911 in Privigye, then part of Hungary in the Austro-Hungarian Empire (now Prievidza, Slovakia), one of three children of Filip Frieder and Ružena Messinger; he had a brother, Emanuel, and a sister, Gittel. After eight years of study at yeshivas in Topoľčany and Bratislava, he was ordained in 1932. He was a rabbi in Zvolen between 1933 and 1937, and later ministered to the Jewish community of Nové Mesto nad Váhom. Before World War II, he was the vice-chairman of the Central Zionist Organization. He and his wife, Ružena (née Berl) had a son, Gideon (born in 1937), and a daughter, Gita (born in 1940).

== The Holocaust ==
After the Slovak State, which declared independence in 1939, began to persecute Jews, Frieder responded by organizing soup kitchens and giving inspiring sermons. Frieder was employed by the Ústredňa Židov (a Judenrat) and joined the opposition movement within it, the Working Group. By this time, he was the leading Neolog rabbi in Slovakia, and the chairman of Yeshurun, the organization of Neolog communities. Frieder used his prewar acquaintance with Jozef Sivák, the Minister of Education, to obtain information on anti-Jewish actions. Sivák was probably the government official that informed the Working Group in late February 1942 about the forthcoming mass deportation of Slovak Jews.

On 8 March, Frieder personally delivered a petition from Slovakia's leading rabbis to President Jozef Tiso, protesting the planned deportation. Although the Working Group was not aware of the Nazi plan to murder all Jews, they knew enough about the massacres and widespread starvation for Jews in Poland that they decried the deportation as tantamount to "the physical destruction of the Jews in Slovakia". The petition read, in part:

In desperation we call upon you, dear President, the supreme judge of the country, convinced that your Excellency also believes in the Supreme Judge above him, and as servants of the Supreme Being, in our sorrow we ask with humility, listen to our plea and respond to us, for we find ourselves facing a great calamity. Are we not all created by the same God before whom we are fated to give an account? Have pity on us, on our families, our wives, men, children and elders, who with tears implore our Father in heaven for deliverance and mercy. We place our fate in your hands.

Tiso ignored the petition; Frieder later wrote that "One would think that words that come from the heart could penetrate the heart. But it was not the case." Despite the prohibition on Jews issuing official documents, Frieder's petition was widely duplicated and circulated among Slovak government officials, legislators, bishops, and other Catholic religious leaders. However, the Slovak government supported the deportation of Jews, so the protests were ineffective. During the first transports, only single men and women were deported; Frieder issued fraudulent marriage licenses to his congregants. Between 26 March and 20 October 1942, about 57,000 Jews, two-thirds of the Jews in Slovakia at the time, were deported. Only a few hundred survived the war.

Frieder was also a key figure in the Working Group's illegal relief scheme, sending valuables and money to deported Slovak Jews via smugglers, which they could trade for food or other necessities. Because of his activity, he was arrested on 22 September 1942, but continued these efforts on his release. A letter sent to Switzerland jointly by Frieder and his Working Group colleague Rabbi Michael Dov Weissmandl on 1 December 1942, mentioning mass executions at Bełżec extermination camp, was the first indication that the Working Group knew about the organized extermination of Jewish deportees.

In 1943, Frieder collected testimony from an escapee from Treblinka extermination camp, which was also sent to the Working Group's contacts in Switzerland. Soon after the German invasion of Slovakia concurrent with the Slovak National Uprising in August 1944, Frieder was imprisoned in Bratislava. Released by the end of the month, he was arrested in the 28 September roundup in Bratislava and was imprisoned at Sereď concentration camp. Meanwhile, his family had fled to Banská Bystrica, the center of the uprising. Frieder's wife and daughter were killed in a German attack on the nearby village of Staré Hory, and his son was wounded. Frieder managed to avoid deportation from Sereď and survived the war.

== Postwar life and death ==
After the war, Frieder returned to Bratislava shortly after the city's liberation. He took immediate action to restore Jewish community life, establishing a Yeshurun, and also practical measures to help survivors. In September, he became the chairman of the Central Union of Jewish Religious Communities in Slovakia (ÚSŽNO). Subsequently, he was named the Chief Rabbi of Slovakia; this angered the Orthodox faction in the country, which represented 70% of surviving Jews. Frieder found it difficult to bridge the gap between the communities, but eventually succeeded by giving the Orthodox faction control over kashrut, marriage, and halakha. He organized a conference in Bratislava for Jewish resistance during the Holocaust, speaking about the activities of the Working Group.

In early 1946, he fell ill in London while traveling to raise money for relief. Upon his return to Slovakia, he was operated on by the Slovak physician and rescuer of Jews, Karel František Koch. Two days later, on 21 June 1946, he died shortly before his thirty-fifth birthday, which "came as a shock to the community", according to his brother Emanuel. Armin had been slated to testify as the main witness for the prosecution at the trial of Anton Vašek, a corrupt official who organized the deportation of Jews. Emanuel succeeded him as chairman of the ÚSŽNO, and published his brother's diaries (originally 800 pages written in Slovak and German) as To Deliver Their Souls. Frieder had been known for his embrace of Zionism, after his death, his son emigrated to Palestine.
