= Auschwitz Protocols =

1943/44 eyewitness accounts of concentration camp

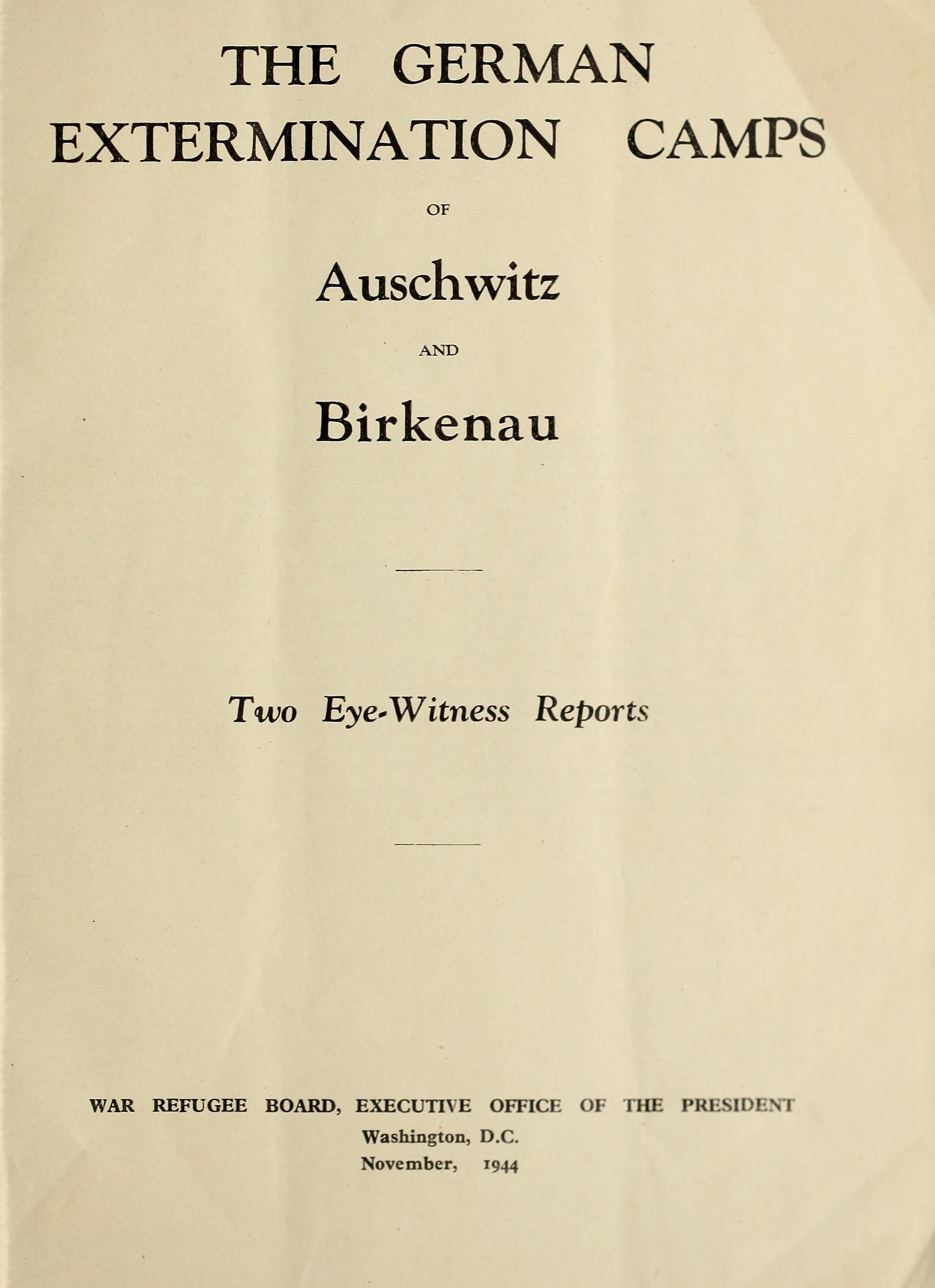
The German Extermination Camps of Auschwitz and Birkenau - title page, November 1944

The Auschwitz Protocols, also known as the Auschwitz Reports, and originally published as The Extermination Camps of Auschwitz and Birkenau, is a collection of three eyewitness accounts from 1943 to 1944 about the mass murder that was taking place inside the Auschwitz concentration camp in German-occupied Poland during the Second World War. The eyewitness accounts are individually known as the Vrba–Wetzler report, Polish Major's report, and Rosin-Mordowicz report.

== Description ==
The reports were compiled by prisoners who had escaped from the camp and presented in their order of importance from the Western Allies' perspective, rather than in chronological order. The escapees who authored the reports were Rudolf Vrba and Alfred Wetzler (the Vrba–Wetzler report); Arnošt Rosin and Czesław Mordowicz (the Rosin-Mordowicz report); and Jerzy Tabeau (the "Polish Major's report").

The Vrba–Wetzler report was widely disseminated by the Bratislava Working Group in April 1944, and with help of the Romanian diplomat Florian Manoliu, the report or a summary obtained from Moshe Krausz in Budapest reached—tragically with much delay—George Mantello (Mandl), El Salvador Embassy First Secretary in Switzerland, via Manoliu who brought it to Mantello. Mantello immediately publicized it despite request from Rudolf Kasztner to keep it confidential.

This triggered large-scale demonstrations in Switzerland, sermons in Swiss churches about the tragic plight of Jews and a Swiss press campaign of about 400 headlines protesting the atrocities against Jews. The unprecedented events in Switzerland and possibly other considerations led to threats of retribution against Hungary's Regent Miklós Horthy by President Roosevelt, Winston Churchill and others. This was one of the main factors which convinced Horthy to stop the Hungarian death camp transports.

The full reports were published—with seven months delay—by the United States War Refugee Board on 26 November 1944 under the title The Extermination Camps of Auschwitz (Oświęcim) and Birkenau in Upper Silesia. They were submitted in evidence at the Nuremberg Trials as document number 022-L, and are held in the War Refugee Board archives in the Franklin D. Roosevelt Presidential Library and Museum in Hyde Park, New York.

It is not known when they were first called the Auschwitz Protocols, but Randolph L. Braham may have been the first to do so. He used that term for the document in The Politics of Genocide: The Holocaust in Hungary (1981).

== Component reports ==
- The Vrba–Wetzler report (the term "Auschwitz Protocols" is sometimes used to refer to just this report), a 33-page report written around 24 April 1944, after Vrba and Wetzler, two Slovak prisoners, who escaped from Auschwitz 7–11 April 1944. In the Protocols, it was 33 pages long and was called "No 1. The Extermination Camps of Auschwitz (Oswiecim) and Birkenau in Upper Silesia."
- The Rosin-Mordowicz report, a seven-page report from Arnošt Rosin and Czesław Mordowicz, also Slovak prisoners, who escaped from Auschwitz on 27 May 1944. This was presented as an additional chapter "III. Birkenau" to the Vrba–Wetzler report.
- The "Polish Major's report," written by Jerzy Tabeau (or Tabau), who was in Auschwitz under the pseudonym Jerzy Wesołowski, and who escaped with Roman Cieliczko on 19 November 1943. Zoltán Tibori Szabó writes that Tabeau compiled his report between December 1943 and January 1944. It was copied using a stencil machine in Geneva in August 1944, and was distributed by the Polish government-in-exile and Jewish groups. This was presented in the Protocols as the 19-page "No 2. Transport (The Polish Major's Report)."

The contents of the Protocols was discussed in detail by The New York Times on 26 November 1944.

== See also ==
- The Black Book of Poland - 1942 report about Nazi atrocities in occupied Poland
- Karski's reports - 1939–1942 series of reports describing the situation in occupied Poland
- Pilecki's Report, aka Witold's report - report about Auschwitz written in 1943 by Witold Pilecki
- The Polish White Book - 1940 and 1941 reports about Polish-German relations before and after 1939
- Raczyński's Note - December 1942 note by Poland's Foreign Affairs Minister-in-exile regarding Nazi extermination of Jews
- Bibliography of the Holocaust § Primary Sources
