= Czesław Mordowicz =

Holocaust survivor (1919–2001)

Czesław Mordowicz (2 August 1919 – 28 October 2001) was a Polish Jew who, with Arnošt Rosin, escaped from the Auschwitz concentration camp in German-occupied Poland on 27 May 1944, at the height of the Holocaust. A seven-page report dictated by Mordowicz and Rosin joined the Vrba–Wetzler report and a report by Jerzy Tabeau to become the Auschwitz Protocols, a detailed account of the mass murder taking place inside the camp.

== Early life ==
Mordowicz was born in Mława, Poland, to Anna Wicińska, a local actor, and her husband Herman Mordowicz, a grain merchant.

== Escape from Auschwitz ==
On 27 May 1944 Mordowicz (prisoner no. 84216) escaped from Auschwitz in German-occupied Poland to Slovakia with Arnošt Rosin (no. 29858), originally from Snina, Slovakia. They arrived in Slovakia on 6 June, and dictated their report to Oskar Krasniansky of the Slovak Jewish Council in the home of a local man, Boby Reich, in Liptovský Mikuláš. In April that year Rudolf Vrba and Alfréd Wetzler had dictated the Vrba–Wetzler report to Krasniansky after their escape from Auschwitz. Mordowicz and Rosin confirmed the details Vrba and Wetzler had given. They also told Krasniansky that, between 15 and 27 May, 100,000 Hungarian Jews had arrived at Auschwitz and most had been gassed on arrival.

== Uprising and re-internment at Auschwitz ==
In August 1944 Slovak partisans launched an uprising against the collaborationist Slovak State, as a result of which the Germans invaded the country. Mordowicz was among those arrested. He was returned to Auschwitz, but the SS failed to recognize him, which saved his life, and he was sent to another camp, then liberated. Both Mordowicz and Rosin survived the war. Decades later Mordowicz described his efforts to warn other passengers on the train to Auschwitz that they were being taken to their deaths and should try to jump. The passengers began shouting and banging on the doors, he told an interviewer, to which the guards responded by beating him. He then chewed off the tattoo with his prisoner number, hoping the SS at Auschwitz would not be able to identify him.

== The Mordowicz-Rosin Report ==
The report by Mordowicz and Rosin reached the Vatican in June 1944. On July 10, the representative of the Jewish Council who had recorded Mordowicz and Rosin’s accounts drafted a German version of their report, which was sent to Switzerland and Turkey.
