= Anton Vašek =

Slovak Holocaust perpetrator (1905–1946)

- Born: 1905
- Died: 1946 (aged 40–41)
- Cause of death: Execution
- Known for: Head of Department 14 of the Central Economic Office
- Criminal penalty: Death

Anton Vašek (1905–1946) was the head of Department 14 in the Slovak State's Central Economic Office. He is known for accepting bribes in exchange for reducing deportation of Jews from Slovakia.

== Life ==
Vašek attended law school. One of his classmates was the Jewish Tibor Kováč.

On 3 April 1942, Vašek was appointed head of Department 14 in the Slovak State's Central Economic Office. This department was in charge of organizing the deportations during the Holocaust in Slovakia. Vašek was soon approached by Kováč, who was now a member of the Working Group, a Jewish resistance organization. Due to their prior relationship, Kováč was able to bribe Vašek, and visited his office almost daily to deliver bribes and provide Vašek with excuses to explain delays in deportations to his superiors. Vašek's desire for money to fund his gambling and womanizing made him susceptible to bribery; he was the highest-ranking Slovak official to accept bribes from the Working Group. Due to Vašek's intervention, a 26 June transport of Jews was cancelled; Vašek presented Interior Minister Alexander Mach with a falsified report that all non-exempt Jews had already been deported. Mach was skeptical about the report, however, and the deportations resumed in July.

Although Vašek accepted thousands of Slovak koruna in bribes, he continued to organize transports and said that the "Jewish question must be solved 100 percent". Due to his high-handedness in exercising power over life and death, Vašek became known as the "king of the Jews" (Slovak: Židovský kráľ). He was known to pull Jews out of cattle cars after receiving a bribe, only to send them on the next transport.

Vašek was tried by the National Tribunal, accused of accepting 2 million koruna in bribes and being responsible for the deportation of 50,000 Slovak Jews to concentration camps. Kováč was a key witness for the prosecution at the trial. He was convicted on 28 July 1946, sentenced to death, and executed.
