= Escape of Dionys Lenard from Majdanek =

In July 1942, Daniel Dionys Lenard escaped from Majdanek concentration camp. He was interviewed by the Bratislava Working Group and brought the first confirmed report of the killings back to the Jewish community in Slovakia.

Lenard was born in Žilina and was a Slovak Jew. His sister and his parents illegally entered Palestine before the Holocaust but were caught by the British and returned to Slovakia. Rachel Lenard, Lenard's sister, joined an agricultural Hachshara in Denmark in 1939 from where she went to Sweden and survived. Lenard and his parents remained and were deported to separate camps in the spring of 1942. His parents were murdered. Lenard managed to escape back to Slovakia in July 1942, where he gave an extensive account of the high mortality at the Majdanek concentration camp.
