= Saly Mayer =

Saly Mayer (1882–1950) was a clothing manufacturer in Switzerland who was an official of the Joint Distribution Committee (JDC), a Jewish relief organization headquartered in New York City. He had a wife and son. He worked to save Jews. He organized aid for refugees and negotiated with the Nazis for the release of Jews in exchange for equipment and funds. Despite being restricted on what he could exchange his negotiations are credited with buying time in order to save prisoners.

== Legacy ==
Documents including communiques remain from his work.

A book by rabbi Amos Bunim about his father, Irving M. Bunim, is sharply critical of Mayer.
