= Jaromír Kopecký =

Jaromír Kopecký was the ambassador of Czechoslovakia to Switzerland in the immediate post-war period and also a close associate of Edvard Beneš. His son, Radim Kopecký, was a childhood friend of Václav Havel.
