= George Mantello =

Romanian-born diplomat, saved Jews during the Holocaust (1901–1992)

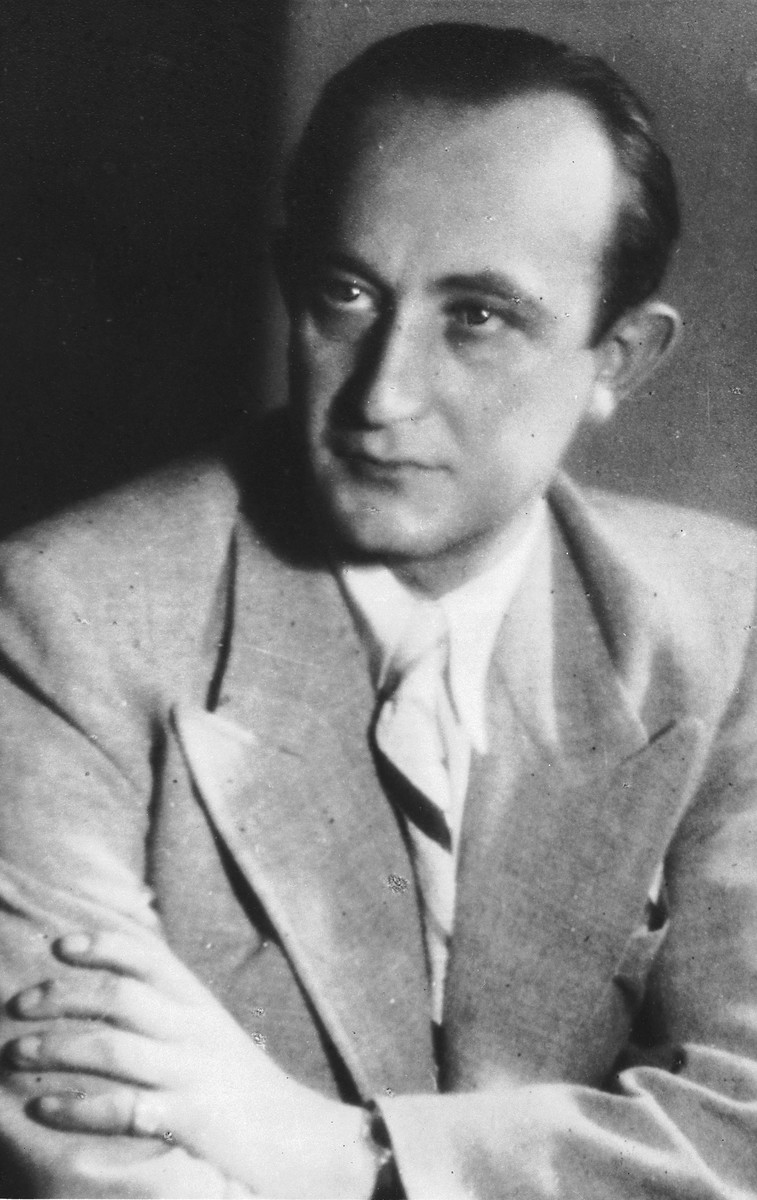
- Born: György Mandl; 11 December 1901; Lekence, Kingdom of Hungary
- Died: 25 April 1992 (aged 90); Rome, Italy
- Resting place: Jerusalem, Israel
- Known for: Rescue of Jews during the Holocaust
- Children: 3

George Mantello (born György Mandl; 11 December 1901 – 25 April 1992), a businessman with various diplomatic activities, born into a Jewish family from Transylvania, helped save thousands of Hungarian Jews from the Holocaust while working for the Salvadoran consulate in Geneva, Switzerland from 1942 to 1945 under the protection of consul Castellanos Contreras, by providing them with fictive Salvadoran citizenship papers. He publicized in mid-1944 the deportation of Hungarian Jews to the Auschwitz-Birkenau death camp, which had great impact on rescue, rapidly led to unprecedented large-scale grass root protests by the Swiss people and church, which was a major contributing factor to Hungary's regent Miklós Horthy stopping the transports to Auschwitz.

During Mantello's youth, Transylvania was part of Hungary, itself part of the Austro-Hungarian Empire; after the First World War it became part of Romania, but in 1940 Hungary recovered the northern part of the historical region, including Mantello's birth region, thanks to the Second Vienna Award. Both Hungary and Romania were allies of Nazi Germany, and Mantello had to first use all his remarkable skills and connections to save himself, his wife and his child from Nazi deportation by escaping to Switzerland.

Mantello is buried in the Jerusalem Har Hamenuchot cemetery.

== Background ==
Mantello was born György Mandl to Orthodox Jewish parents – Baruch Yehudah Mandl and Ida Mandl (née Spitz) – in Lekence, Kingdom of Hungary (today Lechința, Romania), in the historical region of Transylvania, with mainly Romanian, Hungarian and German ethnic inhabitants, which changed hands three times between Hungary and Romania during the 20th century. David Kranzler writes that his paternal grandfather was a rabbi, R. Yitzchok Yaakov Mandl, that his father owned a mill, and that the family was regarded as well-to-do. Mantello had three sisters and two brothers, one of whom, Josef Mandl, became involved in Mandl-Mantello's rescue work.

== Second World War ==
Mantello became a textiles manufacturer in Bucharest, where he met Salvadoran consul Colonel José Arturo Castellanos in the 1930s. After escaping to Switzerland from Romania, he went to work for Castellanos at the Salvadoran consulate in Geneva as First Secretary. He and Colonel Castellanos issued a large number of Salvadoran certificates which were smuggled into Nazi occupied territories and saved many Jews.

In 1944 he became involved in the effort to halt the deportation of Hungarian Jews to Auschwitz. Mantello sent his friend, a diplomat from Romania, Florian Manoliu, to Hungary, in order to find out what was happening there. Manoliu went to Budapest, obtained reports from Hungarian Orthodox Jew Moshe Krausz with the help of Swiss vice-Consul Carl Lutz on 19 June 1944, and immediately returned with the reports to Geneva. One of the reports was probably Rabbi Chaim Michael Dov Weissmandl's abridged 5-page version of the full 33-page Auschwitz Protocols: both the Vrba–Wetzler report and Rosin-Mordowicz report. The reports described in detail the operations of the Auschwitz-Birkenau death camp.

The second report was a 6-page Hungarian release that detailed the ghettoization and deportation, town by town, of the 435,000 Hungarian Jews, updated to 19 June 1944, to Auschwitz.

Manilou met Mantello hours after he returned to Switzerland - very early June 21, 1944 - and gave him the reports. In contrast to many leaders who received these reports and failed to act on them, with much help from Swiss Pastor Paul Vogt Mantello publicized the details within a day of receiving them. This triggered a significant grass roots protest in Switzerland, including masses within days, street protests, and the Swiss press campaign starting June 24, 1944: over 400 headlines in the Swiss press demanded (against censorship rules) an end to the deportations. Pastor Paul Vogt wrote a bestseller Soll ich meines Bruders Hüter sein? (Am I my brother's keeper? - reference to Cain and Abel in the Bible).

The report's publication and large scale very vocal protests in Switzerland resulted in Winston Churchill's letter:"There is no doubt that this persecution of Jews in Hungary and their expulsion from enemy territory is probably the greatest and most horrible crime ever committed in the whole history of the world...." As a result of the press coverage, world leaders issued appeals and warnings to Hungary's Regent, Miklós Horthy, and the mass transports by Hungary, which had been deporting 12,000 Jews every day since 15 May 1944, mostly ended on 9 July 1944 pursuant to Horthy's order issued on 7 July. The lull in deportations made it possible to organize significant rescue activities in Hungary, such as the Raoul Wallenberg mission and continued protection of Jews by Carl Lutz. Wallenberg arrived to the Swedish embassy in Budapest on 9 July 1944.

== Recognition ==
Mantello received an honorary doctorate from Yeshiva University in New York after efforts were made from historian David Kranzler and Yeshiva University Chancellor Rabbi Professor Norman Lamm. Because he was Jewish, György Mandl/George Mantello was not eligible for the title "Righteous Among the Nations", which is conferred by Israel to non-Jews who saved Jews during the holocaust.

== See also ==
- El Salvador during World War II

== Some recorded talks and music ==
- George Mandel-Mantello and his Mission to Rescue Europe's Jews (Curators Corner #7)
- Prof. David Kranzler. Rescue by El Salvador, its diplomat George Mantello and the Swiss People (Feb 2003)
- Prof. David Kranzler. George Mantello and the Swiss people stopping the Hungarian Auschwitz transports
- Rabbi Dr. Norman Lamm. Beacons in the Dark
- Professor MP Irv Cotler. Beacons in the Dark
- The Rescuers song by David Ben Reuven
