= Alfréd Wetzler =

Slovak Jewish writer (1918–1988)

Alfred Wetzler
- Born: Alfred Israel Wetzler; 10 May 1918; Nagyszombat, Austria-Hungary (present-day Trnava, Slovakia)
- Died: 8 February 1988 (aged 69); Bratislava, Czechoslovakia
- Other name: Jozef Lánik (pen name)
- Occupations: Writer, editor, farmer
- Known for: Escapee of Auschwitz Concentration Camp (10 April 1944); Writing the Vrba-Wetzler report, alongside fellow escapee Rudolf Vrba (released mid-1944)

Alfréd Israel Wetzler (10 May 1918 – 8 February 1988), who wrote under the alias Jozef Lánik, was a Slovak Jewish writer. He is known for escaping from Auschwitz concentration camp and co-writing the Vrba-Wetzler Report, which helped halt the deportation of Jews from Hungary, saving up to 200,000 lives.

== Background ==
Wetzler was born in Nagyszombat, Austria-Hungary (now Trnava, Slovakia). After his birthplace became part of Czechoslovakia, he was a worker in Trnava during the period 1936–1940. He was sent to the Birkenau (Auschwitz II) camp in 1942 and escaped from it with Rudolf Vrba on 10 April 1944. Together with Rudolf Vrba he wrote up the story of his experiences in Slovak as Auschwitz, Tomb of Four Million People, a factual account of the Wetzler–Vrba report and of other witnesses. The document combined the material from the Vrba–Wetzler report and two others, which were submitted together in evidence at the Nuremberg Trials as document no. 022-L, exhibit no. 294-USA. He later wrote a fictionalized account under the alias Jozef Lánik called What Dante Did Not See.

After the war, Wetzler worked as an editor (1945–1950), worked in Bratislava (1950–1955) and on a farm (1955–1970). After 1970 he stopped working owing to poor health. He died in Bratislava in 1988. He is buried in the Orthodox Jewish Cemetery.

== Vrba–Wetzler report ==
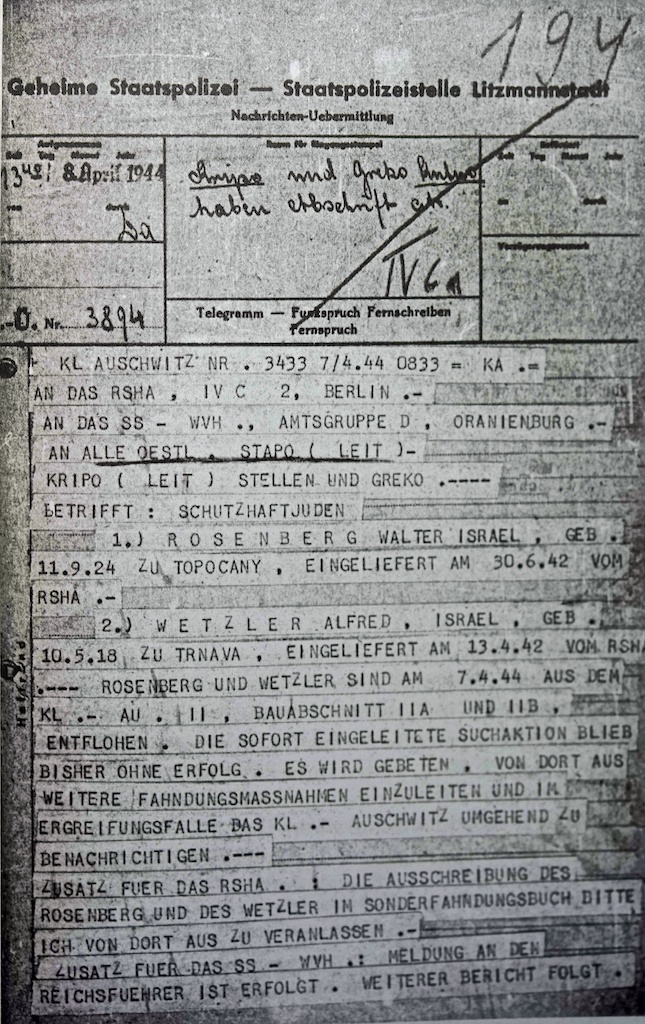
Internal SS report on the escape. (1944)

Wetzler is known for the report that he and his fellow escapee, Rudolf Vrba, compiled about the inner workings of the Auschwitz camp–a ground plan of the camp, construction details of the gas chambers, crematoria and, most convincingly, a label from a canister of Zyklon B. The 33-page Vrba–Wetzler report, as it became known, released in mid 1944, was the first detailed report about Auschwitz to reach the West that the Allies were ready to believe (in 1943, Polish officer Witold Pilecki had written and forwarded his own report to the Polish government in exile and, through it, to the British and other Allied governments).

The deportations from Hungary halted after Hungarian-Romanian Jew George Mantello, then First Secretary of the El Salvador mission in Switzerland, publicized the report, which led to the saving of up to 120,000 Hungarian Jews. The publication of parts of the report in June 1944 is credited with helping to persuade the Hungarian regent, Miklós Horthy, to halt the deportation of that country's Jews to Auschwitz, which had been proceeding at a rate of 12,000 a day since May 1944.

On 26 June, Richard Lichtheim of the Jewish Agency in Geneva sent a telegram to England calling on the Allies to hold members of the Hungarian government personally responsible for the killings. The cable was intercepted by the Hungarian government and shown to Prime Minister Döme Sztójay, who passed it to Horthy. Horthy ordered an end to the deportations on 7 July, and they stopped two days later.

Adolf Hitler instructed the Nazi representative to Hungary, Edmund Veesenmayer, to relay an angry message to Horthy. Horthy resisted Hitler's threats, and Budapest's 200,000–260,000 Jews were temporarily spared from deportation, until the pro-Nazi Arrow Cross Party seized power in Hungary in a coup on 15 October 1944. Henceforth, the deportations resumed, but by then, the diplomatic involvement of the Swedish, Swiss, Spanish, and Portuguese embassies in Budapest, as well as that of the papal nuncio, Angelo Rotta, saved tens of thousands until the arrival of the Red Army in Budapest in January 1945.

The historian Sir Martin Gilbert said: "Alfred Wetzler was a true hero. His escape from Auschwitz, and the report he helped compile, telling for the first time the truth about the camp as a place of mass murder, led directly to saving the lives of thousands of Jews – the Jews of Budapest who were about to be deported to their deaths. No other single act in the Second World War saved so many Jews from the fate that Hitler had determined for them."

== See also ==
- Bibliography of The Holocaust
- Witold Pilecki
- Pilecki's Report
