= Ústredňa Židov =

Judenrat in Nazi-occupied Slovakia

- Jewish youth at a retraining course organized by the ÚŽ, 1941
- Formation: September 1940
- Dissolved: September 1944
- Type: Judenrat
- Purpose: Implementing anti-Jewish measures in Slovakia
- Headquarters: Jewish Center, Bratislava, Slovakia
- Region served: Slovakia
- Members: 89,000 (1940)
- Owner: Dieter Wisliceny
- Starosta (leader): Heinrich Schwartz; (Sept. 1940–April 1941); Arpad Sebestyen; (April 1941–Dec. 1943); Oskar Neumann; (Dec. 1943–Sept. 1944)

The Ústredňa Židov (ÚŽ; English: Jewish Center) was the Judenrat in Bratislava that was imposed on the Jewish community of the Axis-aligned state of Slovakia to implement Nazi orders during the Holocaust. It was formed on the advice of SS (Schutzstaffel) official Dieter Wisliceny; the first leader, Heinrich Schwartz, was removed after refusing to cooperate with Nazi demands and replaced by the ineffectual Arpad Sebestyen. The collaborationist Department of Special Affairs run by Karol Hochberg aided the authorities in confiscating Jewish property and collecting information that was used to arrest and deport Jews. Nevertheless, most of the ÚŽ members focused on providing opportunities for emigration and improving the social welfare of Jews remaining in Slovakia, although they were hampered by the dwindling resources of the community. In addition, the ÚŽ attempted to resist deportation by bribing Slovak officials, retraining Jews who had been expelled from their previous profession, and improving and expanding labor camps for Jews in Slovakia. The underground resistance organization that ran under its auspices, the Working Group, took over the ÚŽ leadership in December 1943. Since its formation in early 1942, the Working Group had used the ÚŽ as cover for its illegal rescue activities. After the German invasion of Slovakia in August 1944, the ÚŽ was disbanded and many of its members were arrested and deported to concentration camps.

== Background ==
On 14 March 1939, the Slovak State proclaimed its independence from Czechoslovakia under German protection; Jozef Tiso (a Catholic priest) was appointed president. According to the Encyclopedia of Camps and Ghettos, the persecution of Jews was "central to the domestic policy of the Slovak state". Slovak Jews were blamed for the 1938 First Vienna Award—Hungary's annexation of 40 percent of Slovakia's arable land and 270,000 people who had declared Czechoslovak ethnicity. In the state-sponsored media, propagandists claimed that Jews were disloyal and a "radical solution of the Jewish issue" was necessary for the progress of the Slovak nation.

In a process overseen by the Central Economic Office (led by Slovak official Augustín Morávek), 12,300 Jewish-owned businesses were confiscated or liquidated; this deprived most Slovak Jews of their livelihood. Although Jews were initially defined based on religion, the September 1941 "Jewish Code" (based on the Nuremberg Laws) defined them by ancestry. Among the Code's 270 anti-Jewish regulations were the requirement to wear yellow armbands, a ban on intermarriage, and the conscription of able-bodied Jews for forced labor. According to the 1940 census, about 89,000 Jews (slightly more than three percent of the population) lived in the Slovak State. About two-thirds of Jews in Slovakia were Orthodox, of whom many were strongly anti-Zionist. Other Jews belonged to Neolog Judaism or were Zionists influenced by German-Jewish culture. Zionists and Neologs often formed an alliance against Orthodox interests.

== Establishment ==
In response to the anti-Jewish measures, Zionist and Neolog leaders set up an umbrella organization called the ŽÚÚ (Židovská Ústredná Úradovna pre krajinu Slovenska) in late 1939. The ŽÚÚ attempted to negotiate with the Slovak government to ease anti-Jewish measures, as well as help Jews to emigrate and provide education and welfare. They tried to convince the Orthodox Jews to join the organization, to no avail; the lack of cooperation caused the ŽÚÚ to collapse.

In September 1940, Dieter Wisliceny, representing Adolf Eichmann, director of the Jewish section of the Reich Security Main Office, arrived in Bratislava as the Judenberater for Slovakia. His aim was to impoverish the Jewish community so that it became a burden on gentile Slovaks, who would then agree to deport them. On the basis of the Slovak Government Decree 234, passed 26 September, all Jewish community organizations were closed down and the Jews forced to form the Ústredňa Židov (Jewish Center, ÚŽ). The first Judenrat outside the Reich and German-occupied Poland, ÚŽ was the only secular Jewish organization allowed to exist in Slovakia; it inherited the property of the disbanded Jewish organizations. It operated under the direct control of the Central Economic Office and all Jews were required to be members. Its offices were located at multiple addresses in central Bratislava.

Leaders of the Jewish community were divided on how to react to this development. Some refused to associate with the ÚŽ in the belief that it would be used to implement anti-Jewish measures, but more saw participating in the ÚŽ as a way to help their fellow Jews by delaying the implementation of such measures. As a result, the ÚŽ was initially dominated by Jews who refused to collaborate and focused on charitable projects (such as soup kitchens) to help those impoverished by the anti-Jewish measures.

The first leader of the ÚŽ was Heinrich Schwartz, longtime secretary of the Orthodox Jewish community, who had been chosen for his fluency in Slovak. (Note: Slovak Jews who had come of age under Austro-Hungarian rule spoke German or Hungarian as their primary language; most were not fluent in Slovak.) Schwartz, a respected figure in the Orthodox community, was opposed by the Zionists and Neologs, who nevertheless joined the ÚŽ as a minority. Initially, the Zionists and Neologs worked to undermine Schwartz's authority, in order to gain influence for themselves. They were also worried that Schwartz and the Orthodox faction would collaborate with the authorities. These fears proved groundless; Schwatz thwarted anti-Jewish orders to the best of his ability by delaying their implementation. In particular, he sabotaged a census of Jews in eastern Slovakia with an aim to remove them to the west of the country; Wisliceny had him arrested in April 1941. His replacement was Arpad Sebestyen, who took a position of complete cooperation with Wisliceny. At about this time, Jewish businesses were being "Aryanized", causing massive unemployment. Many Jews who had lost their jobs sought positions in the ÚŽ with the support of the Central Economic Office, causing the introduction of "undesirable elements" who were willing to collaborate.

== Departments ==
=== Emigration ===
The ÚŽ's emigration department was headed by Gisi Fleischmann, a prewar Zionist leader known for her connections to international Jewish organizations. Through the embassies and consulates of neutral countries in Bratislava and Budapest, the department attempted to help Jews immigrate to other countries. The obstacles to immigration were rarely surmounted but a few Jews did manage to immigrate; the last group of 82 Jews left for Mandatory Palestine in April 1941.

=== Welfare ===
The ÚŽ's main challenge was to provide social welfare to Jews who had been deprived of their livelihoods, using the dwindling resources of the Jewish community. By April 1941, 24,767 Jews had lost their jobs (76% of those employed in 1939). By August, the ÚŽ was providing welfare to 23,877 Jews with 1,500 welfare applications to be considered; this consisted of about 3 Slovak koruna (Ks) daily per adult and 2 Ks per child. (Note: At the time, the daily wage for an unskilled laborer was 4–12 Ks.) In addition, the ÚŽ established soup kitchens that fed more than 35,000 people. The organization also funded a hospital, orphanages, and homes for the elderly. It funded healthcare for Jews, establishing free clinics where Jewish doctors practiced.

This money came from resources inherited from Jewish organizations that had been dissolved as well as international organizations, especially the Joint Distribution Committee (JDC). The ÚŽ also levied fees on its own members, but due to the impoverishment of the Jews, only collected 15 million Ks of the 50 million Ks due to it through July 1941. An attempt to take out a loan on immovable property owned by Jews, which had not yet been confiscated, failed due to the Central Economic Office's opposition to giving up its claim to the property. Over time, the ÚŽ's financial situation worsened while the demands on it increased due to the progressive exclusion of Jews from economic life. Despite its poor financial straits, the ÚŽ provided aid to Jews in neighboring countries, who were even worse off, sending packages to Germany, the Protectorate of Bohemia and Moravia, and the General Government. With the Slovak Red Cross, it also provided food to Austrian Jews being deported to Theresienstadt concentration camp or locations in the east. In late 1941, the ÚŽ's budget was cut by one-third while it was struggling to provide aid to tens of thousands of Jews who had been forcibly relocated from their homes. Later, in 1943 and 1944, the ÚŽ received significant food supplies and other support from Jewish and non-Jewish organizations in neutral countries, while a changed leadership of the Central Economic Office, more sympathetic to the Jews, released some funds. The organization was finally able to solve the housing crisis and attempted to find work for its unemployed members, who absorbed the ÚŽ's funds and were most vulnerable to deportations in the event of a resumption.

=== Education and Culture ===
The education and culture department succeeded at keeping most children in school due to an arrangement with Jozef Sivák, the minister of education; Sivák was sympathetic to the Jews. At the end of the 1940–1941 school year, 61 Jewish schools instructed 7,941 children. However, 596 Jewish children did not attend school because a Jewish school did not exist in their area; Jews were barred from attending non-Jewish schools. The department also published a few books, including Theodor Herzl's The Jewish State which was the first publication to promote Zionism. However, the Central Economic Office prevented the ÚŽ from organizing a cultural academy or summer camps for youth, which it characterized as "undesirable activities". Most of the Jewish schools were later taken over for housing Jews displaced by the large-scale internal relocation of Jews in late 1941; educational activities had to cease.

The department also published the only Jewish newspaper allowed, which was called the Vestník Ústredne Židov (Gazette of the Jewish Center), distributed to every Jewish household. In this gazette, the ÚŽ called for calm and discipline for all Jews, in fear that a lack of cooperation would cause reprisals for the entire Jewish community, and held out the promise of immigration to Palestine, an increasingly unrealistic proposition. Kamenec notes that this absolute cooperation and suppression of resistance was exactly what the Slovak State sought to impose on the Jews.

=== Non-Israelites ===
The department for Jews who had converted to Christianity was largely unsuccessful in exempting converts from anti-Jewish measures. It argued that being forced to wear the Star of David would have "severe consequences from the psychological, educational, family and religious points of view".

=== Special Affairs ===
Wisliceny set up a department for "Special Affairs" or "Special Tasks" on 11 June 1941 to ensure the prompt implementation of Nazi decrees, appointing an ambitious, unprincipled Viennese Jew named Karol Hochberg as its director. The main task of the department was collecting statistical data to be used in future forced relocations. On 4 October 1941, the Slovak government ordered 11,466 Jews from Bratislava—those not employed or intermarried—to relocate to fourteen smaller towns: Zvolen, Bardejov, Prešov, Humenné, Liptovský Mikuláš, Michalovce, Nové Mesto nad Váhom, Nitra, Žilina, Stropkov, Topoľčany, Trnava, Vrbové and Spišská Nová Ves. The ÚŽ was forced to pay for their relocation, which Hochberg's office supervised. To be more efficient, he reorganized the department into six subdivisions, for registering Jews, tracking down those who did not report for deportation, keeping track of stolen property, and so forth. More than 160,000 Ks in property was confiscated, despite the fact that the affected Jews were poorer than average. Hochberg personally embezzled some of the confiscated furniture to bribe Wisliceny. According to the official statistics, 5,679 people had been relocated by the beginning of December, and a total of 6,720 had been moved to the towns by the end of March. This did not include some who had been imprisoned in labor camps.

Due to Sebestyen's ineffectuality, Hochberg's department came to dominate the operations of the ÚŽ. During the 1942 deportations, Hochberg's department worked on categorizing Jews. These records were used by various Slovak agencies, such as the Central Economic Office and the Hlinka Guard, for preparing the lists of Jews to be deported. Andrej Steiner, an employee of the ÚŽ who was involved in the Working Group, tipped off the Slovak police to Hochberg's acceptance of bribes from the Working Group on behalf of Wisliceny; Hochberg was arrested in November 1942 and jailed for corruption. Although Hochberg's collaborationism was strongly opposed by much of the ÚŽ leadership, it tarnished the ÚŽ's reputation in the Jewish community, which persisted even years after Hochberg had lost power.

=== Retraining and labor camps ===
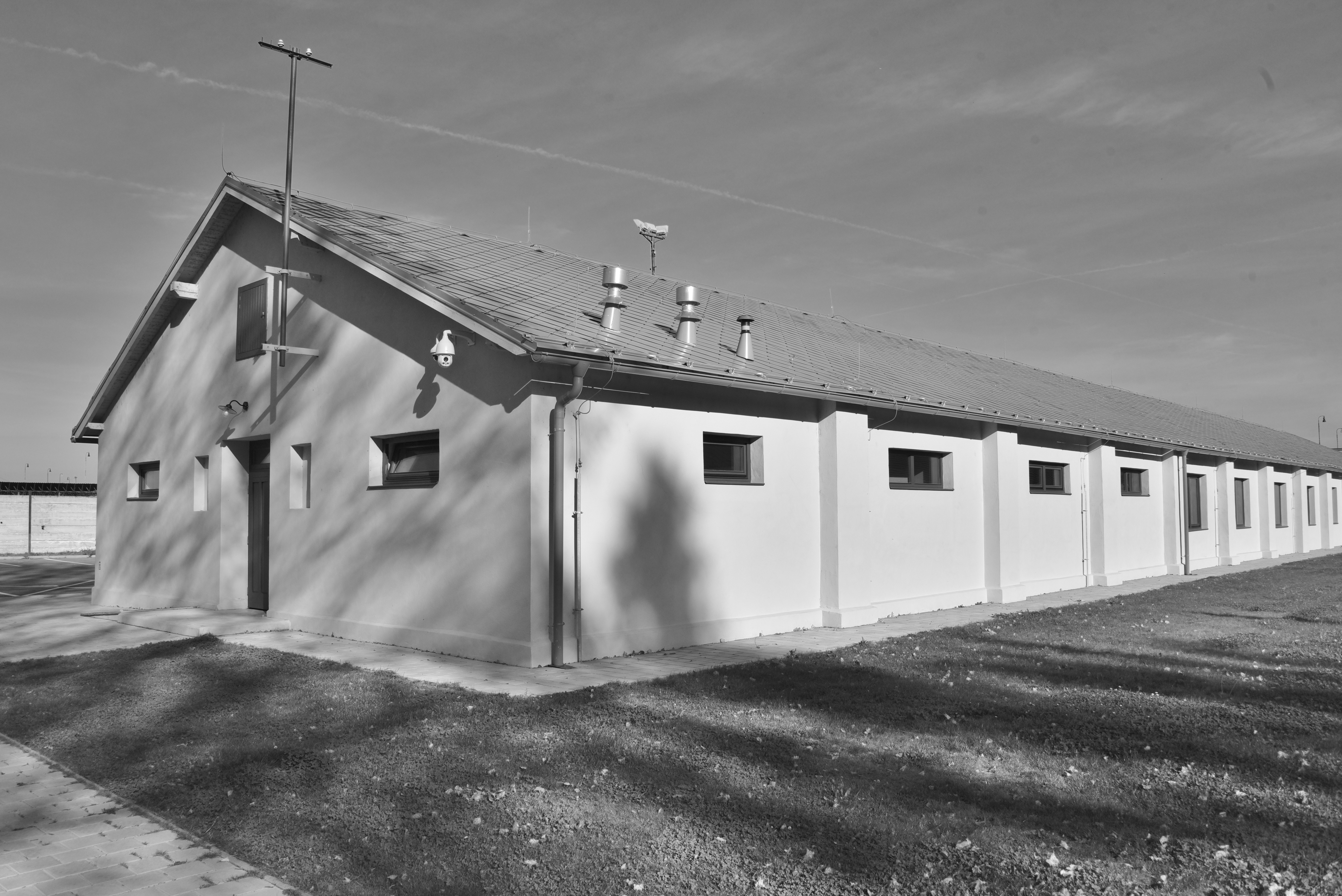
Barracks at Sereď labor camp

As an outgrowth of the work of the welfare department, a retraining department led by Oskar Neumann ran retraining courses for Jews put out of work, supposedly in preparation for emigration to Palestine. However, Neumann was able to use his position in order to extend aid to the Zionist youth movements, which had been banned. By February 1941, 13,612 people had applied for these courses but only a few could be accommodated. In June, 63 courses were retraining 1,300 Jews for agricultural work. Craft retraining programs were more difficult to organize because Jewish businesses were rapidly liquidated. Nevertheless, by July there were 605 participants in such courses. Many graduates later worked in the labor camps in Slovakia. The ÚŽ paid for the courses, which included instruction in the Hebrew language and life in the future Jewish state.

In a further step to reduce unemployment, the ÚŽ established labor camps and centers, an activity approved by an April 1941 decree. Although this effort was connected to the discriminatory conscription of all Jewish men aged 18–60 for labor, it had a beneficial effect for unemployed Jews. The first center was established at Strážke in spring 1941; by September, about 5,500 Jews were working at 80 sites. The companies employing the Jews enjoyed cheap labor, but the ÚŽ had to subsidize their wages to meet the legal minimum. By the end of the year, most of these centers were dissolved, officially due to the harsh weather conditions. According to Slovak historian Ivan Kamenec, the real reason was that the Slovak State was planning to deport the Jewish workers. Instead, three larger camps were established at Sereď, Nováky, and Vyhne. The ÚŽ financed the construction of these camps in the fall of 1941; however, the government began to discourage construction (because it planned to deport Jews instead) in the fall of 1941.

During the deportations, the welfare department provided aid to Jews forced into concentration centers for deportation, providing blankets and other supplies to indigent Jews to take with them. However, its efforts were inadequate to alleviate the poor housing, food, and sanitary conditions. During the deportations, the desperate Slovak Jewish leadership tried to use the camps as a way to save the Jews imprisoned there. Alois Pecuch, the director of the camps, and others were bribed to prevent the deportation of the Jews working in the camps, but many local commanders ignored their instructions to this effect. Sereď and Nováky were used as concentration centers and their workers targeted for deportation on the last trains of autumn 1942. Jews deported from Slovakia had to sign a declaration surrendering their remaining property to the ÚŽ. 2,500 Jews, out of the 18,945 legally present, were living in these three camps at the end of 1942.

In March 1943, the Central Office for Jewish Labor Camps (Ústredná kancelária pre pracovné tábory Židov) was established in order to increase production in the labor camps. The Central Office also improved conditions in the camps by constructing new buildings and staging cultural activities for prisoners. Bribery of labor-camp guards continued, in order to ease life for the inmates.

=== Appeals ===
During the 1942 deportations a Department of Appeals, led by Tibor Kováč, was formed in order to ensure that exemptions from deportation would be honored. The department also helped Jews apply for exemptions. The workers in this department went to great lengths to save Jews; some were arrested and deported while attempting to obtain the release of Jews from detention centers. There is little information on how much success it had.

== Illegal resistance ==
In summer 1941, several ÚŽ members dissatisfied with the Department of Special Affairs gathered around Gisi Fleischmann, who began holding meetings for the nascent resistance group in her office. In 1942, this group was eventually formalized into an underground organization known as the "Working Group". It was an alliance of the ideological factions in the UŽ, led by Fleischmann and the anti-Zionist Orthodox rabbi Michael Dov Weissmandl. Other members included Oskar Neumann, assimilationist Tibor Kováč, Neolog rabbi Armin Frieder, and the apolitical architect Andrej Steiner. Israeli historian Livia Rothkirchen emphasizes that the members of the Working Group operated in dual capacities as resistance members and official representatives, coordinating legal and illegal activities, which makes it difficult to draw a distinction between the two groups' activities. She also notes that the successes of the Working Group were due in large part to the official standing of the ÚŽ.

Censorship of correspondence and this newsletter intensified in early 1942 during the deportations, in order to prevent the ÚŽ from warning the Jewish population. After news of forthcoming deportations was leaked on 3 March 1942, many Jews came to the ÚŽ offices in Bratislava to confirm the rumors. Several ÚŽ officials signed a petition detailing the economic arguments for retaining Jews in Slovakia and mailed it illegally to Tiso. The chairman of the ÚŽ, Arpad Sebestyen, also wrote a petition arguing that the Jews could serve as a source of cheap labor in Slovakia, to the profit of Slovak companies, and sent it illegally to the Slovak parliament. These efforts failed to halt or delay the deportations. Despite censorship, the ÚŽ managed to insert covert warnings into the official circulars.

Later, the Working Group attempted to prevent the deportation of Jews by bribing German and Slovak officials. Sebestyen was aware of the activities of the Working Group and made no effort to stop them; neither did he report them to the authorities. In December 1943, a reorganization of the Slovak government caused Sebestyen to be let go. The Jewish community was allowed to choose his successor and the Working Group voted unanimously for Oskar Neumann, one of its members, effectively taking over the ÚŽ. Neumann focused on restoring the reputation of the ÚŽ in the Jewish community. The Working Group activists even distributed information about rescue operations in official ÚŽ messages.

== Dissolution ==
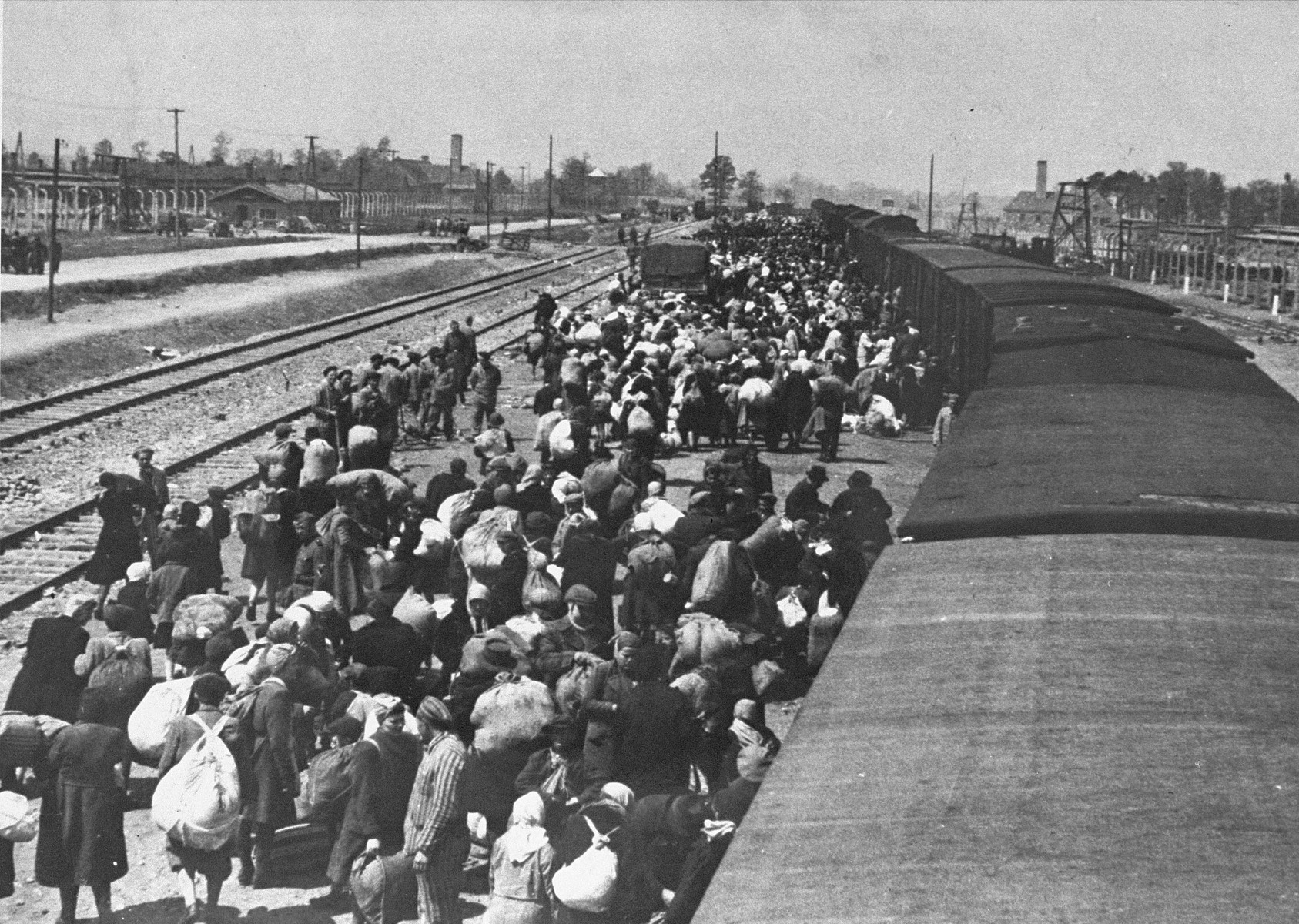
Jews from Carpathian Ruthenia arrive at Auschwitz, May 1944

Because of Germany's imminent military defeat, much of the Slovak populace and the leadership of the army switched its allegiance to the Allies. Increasing partisan activity in the mountains caused a dilemma for Jews and the leadership in particular. The Slovak government ordered the removal of Jews from eastern Slovakia; the ÚŽ leadership was able to avoid their resettlement in camps. On 29 August 1944, Germany invaded Slovakia in response to the increase in partisan sabotage. The same day, the Slovak National Uprising was launched, but it was crushed by the end of October. The Jews, who fought with the partisans in substantial numbers, were blamed for the uprising, providing the Germans with an excuse to implement the Final Solution. Eichmann sent SS-Hauptsturmführer Alois Brunner to Bratislava to oversee the deportation and murder of some 25,000 surviving Jews in Slovakia. Immediately after the German invasion, Neumann disbanded the ÚŽ and told its members to go into hiding or flee. The ÚŽ employees suffered the same fate as the remaining Slovak Jews; most were deported to concentration camps. Among prominent UŽ members, Hochberg was executed as a collaborator by Jewish partisans during the uprising, Fleischmann was killed in Auschwitz concentration camp, and Neumann survived in Theresienstadt. Frieder, Steiner, and Kováč were able to avoid deportation. Frieder died in 1946 of a heart condition, Steiner emigrated to the United States, and Kováč killed himself in 1952 after suffering harassment from the secret police.
