= Arrows in the Dark =

Book by Tuvia Friling

- Cover of the Hebrew edition
- Author: Tuvia Friling
- Original title: Hets Baarafel: David Ben-Guryon, Hanhagat Ha-yishuv Venisyonot Hatsalah Ba-Shoah
- Translator: Ora Cummings
- Language: English
- Subject: Yishuv
- Publisher: University of Wisconsin Press
- Publication date: 2003
- Publication place: Israel
- Media type: Print (Hardcover)
- Pages: 684
- ISBN: 978-0299175504

Arrows in the Dark: David Ben-Gurion, the Yishuv Leadership and Rescue Attempts during the Holocaust (Hebrew: חץ בערפל: בן-גוריון, הנהגת היישוב וניסיונות הצלה בשואה) is a book by Israeli historian Tuvia Friling dealing with the attitude toward the Holocaust of the leadership of the Yishuv, the Jewish community in Palestine that existed before the establishment of the State of Israel in May 1948. The book examines the leadership's attempts to rescue European Jews who were under threat, and the controversy that surrounds those efforts. The Hebrew edition of the book was published in 1998 and the English version in 2005.

== The historiographic and public debate ==
The attitude of the Yishuv's leadership and its leader David Ben-Gurion to the Holocaust, the extent of knowledge about the murder, the options that were open to the Yishuv and what was actually done – these questions have been widely debated in historical research. For decades the popular view of these questions was that the Yishuv's leadership did not do enough to rescue the Jews who were being murdered by the Nazis. The pioneering comprehensive scientific exploration of this topic was Dina Porat's book of 1986 An Entangled Leadership, the Yishuv and the Holocaust 1942–1945. The book addressed the questions of what the Yishuv knew about the Holocaust and of rescue attempts during the years 1942–1945. The study's conclusion was that the information about the extermination arrived too late, that the Yishuv was too weak to be able to extend help, but that it did as much as was possible.

Tom Segev's book The Seventh Million, published in 1991, was aimed at the wider public and constituted an indictment against the Yishuv's leadership, claiming that Ben-Gurion was indifferent to the victims' fate because of his deeply rooted negative attitude toward the diaspora, and that his efforts for the establishment of the State of Israel came at the expense of rescuing Jews.

Many historians, such as Yehuda Bauer, Shabtai Teveth and Shlomo Aronson, sided with Porat in exonerating the Yishuv. Others, such as Yechiam Weitz and Hava Eshkoli-Wagman analysed specific dimensions. Each of these historians shed light on the topic from a different perspective.

== Friling's book ==
The 684-page English version of the book is to date the most comprehensive and thorough research of the topic. While attempting to show that much was done but that the success rate was very small, the book is a writ for the defense of the Yishuv's leadership and of its head, Ben-Gurion. The book's title "Arrows in the Dark" draws on a quote from Eliezer Kaplan, the Yishuv's "finance minister", who compared the rescue efforts' chances for success to the shooting of arrows in the dark, but insisted on the importance of seizing every opportunity, despite the minimal likelihood of hitting the target. Eliezer Kaplan, the Yishuv's "finance minister", who when referring to the Yishuv's rescue activities said that they had to shoot arrows into the dark, despite the minimal chances of hitting the target.

The book describes, interprets and analyzes the manifold rescue operations conducted by the Yishuv: the plan for the rescue of children (end of 1942 until the end of the war), including Adler-Rudel's efforts from Sweden; the Transnistria Plan (end of 1942 until February–March 1943); the Slovakia Plan that eventually developed into the Europa Plan (end of 1942- October 1943); the "Blood for Trucks" proposal that Joel Brand and Bandi Grosz brought from Hungary (spring 1944 – summer 1944); the clandestine collaboration with Allied intelligence services, including the Paratroopers Plan, and others.

Several harsh and bitter words by Ben-Gurion regarding the negation of the diaspora were used in the debate over the Yishuv's role to prove that he had been indifferent to the Jews' fate, or that in the best case he had adopted a practical approach and therefore decided to focus on what was practicable – the building of the State of Israel. Friling claims that what is important is not what Ben-Gurion said, but what he did or attempted to accomplish. He goes on to provide a lengthy and detailed description of Ben-Gurion's manifold activities.

While Shabtai Teveth, Ben-Gurion's biographer, attempts to prove that the small scope of Ben-Gurion's activity on behalf of Europe's Jews can be explained by the prevailing belief that it was impossible to save the Jews, Friling introduces a new approach in the research of this issue. He claims that Ben-Gurion was deeply involved at all levels in all rescue efforts, but that these activities were mostly clandestine, and thus were conducted in secrecy and were almost never discussed openly. Ben-Gurion even kept silent in face of the accusations about his lack of action. This was compounded by the fact that the rescue operations were of the kind that are best left concealed. Moreover, since most of these efforts were doomed to fail, any explanation would have been perceived as a lame excuse.

Filing shares the opinion that the Rescue Committee chaired by Itzhak Grunbaum was a body without executive powers, a "parliament" in the derogatory language of those days. At the same time he defines the role of the committee as a lightning rod intended to divert public pressure and guarantee the smooth functioning of the operational bodies. Friling goes on to describe the history of the Rescue Committee and highlights its importance in achieving a consensus in the Yishuv, thwarting the danger of disintegration in face of an event with the destructive magnitude of the Holocaust.

Another contribution of this study to our understanding of the period is the identification of the body that was actually responsible for the Yishuv's rescue activities. According to Friling this was the 'Special Operations Section' of the Jewish Agency's Political Department, with people like Reuven Zaslani (Shilohah), Ehud Avriel, Teddy Kollek, Eliahu Eilat (Epstein), and others. They acted together with people of the Hagana and the Illegal Immigration Agency (Mossad Le'aliyah Bet), such as Eliahu Golomb, Shaul Meirov (Avigur), Zeev Shind, David Hacohen, and others, as well as with some of the emissaries of the political parties and movements, such as Menachem Bader and Vanya Pomerantz. According to Friling, this operational arm was directed by an undeclared informal triumvirate, consisting of Ben-Gurion, Moshe Sharett—the head of the Jewish Agency's Political Department, and Eliezer Kaplan—the Jewish Agency's treasurer.

While researchers before Friling searched for documentation in the archives of the central bodies of the Yishuv, where very little evidence of rescue efforts was to be found, Friling looked for documentation in two additional sources: the archives of the British intelligence services, such as the SIS (Secret Intelligence Service), SOE (Special Operations Executive), and of the American agencies, such as the OWI (Office of War Information) or the OSS (Office of Strategic Services). These agencies kept track of the operations of the Yishuv and its emissaries and used them for their intelligence gathering, sabotage operations, etc.

Friling also investigated the cooperation of the Jewish Agency with other Jewish organizations, such as the Joint Distribution Committee and the World Jewish Congress. He uncovered, among others, much information about the transfer by Jewish organizations of funds for rescue activity to enemy countries.

Friling's book innovates our knowledge about the networks operated by Teddy Kollek, Ehud Avriel, and others from Istanbul. These networks were sending couriers with information, operational guidance, communication systems and funds into the occupied countries. The study shows that to their great misfortune, important segments of these networks that Kollek and his colleagues believed to be loyal and dependable, in reality held double and triple agents, activated by the German Military Intelligence (Abwehr) and even the Gestapo. It follows that these networks that the Yishuv believed were in its service, were first and foremost serving the Nazis. Thus many of the operations launched by the Yishuv from Istanbul, including the paratroopers' mission, were totally transparent to the Nazis.

The Hebrew version of the book received the Mordechai Ish Shalom Prize in 1999 and the Prime Minister's Prize – the most prominent Prize awarded by the State Council for the Commemoration of Presidents and Prime Ministers – in 2001.

== Book reviews ==
Reviews on the English version:

- Arnold Ages, "Pre-State Israel impotent in rescuing Holocaust Jewry", The National Jewish Post and Opinion, November 23, 2005, 3 pages
- Arnold Ages, "The Jews of Europe, The Jews of Palestine", Chicago Jewish Star, December 23, 2005, 4 pages
- J. Fischel, emeritus, Millersville University, Middletown, May 2006. Vol. 43, Iss. 9; pg. 1659, 1 p.
- Severin A. Hochberg, U.S. Holocaust Memorial Museum, The Middle East Journal. Washington: Spring 2006, Vol. 60, Iss. 2, p. 385, 3 pgs
- Allan Arkush, Israel Studies, Indiana University press, Summer 2006, Vol. 11–2, pp. 158–161
- Ronald W. Zweig, New York University, American Historical Review, October 2006, p. 1289–1290, 2 pages; RKL, two columns, Hadassah Magazine, Jewish Book Council, October 1, 2005, New York, NY.

== Reviews for the Hebrew version ==
- Anita Shapira, Haaretz / Musaf Sfarim, January 13, 1999
- Shlomo Aronson, Gesher, 140, 1999
- Aviva Halamish, Cathedra, 94, 1999
- Ya'acov Shavit, Iyunim Bitkumat Israel, 9, 1999
- Yehoshuha Halevi, Hauma, 134, 1999
- Yosef Friedlender, Hatsofeh, 1999
- Shmuel Hupert (ed.), Arrow in the Dark, a radio program on IBA, participant: Dr. E. Almog, August 1998
- Eran Sabag, Galey Zahal (IDF broadcasting station), September 11, 1998
- Dr. Y. Noy (ed.), A two-hour radio program on IBA, at the eve of the holocaust Memorial Day, dedicated to the book Arrow in the Dark. Other participants: Prof. Y. Bauer, Prof. S. Aronson, Prof. Y. Gelber, Prof. Y. Porat, Dr. Y. Weitz, Dr. H. Wagman-Eshkoli, Mr. T. Kollek, Mr. I. Berman, April 1999; D. Bloch (ed.), about the book Arrow in the Dark, a radio talk on IBA, April 1999
- Tsur Ehrlich, Makor Rishon, April 21, 2006, Musaf Yoman, pp. 12–13.
