= Karol Hochberg =

Jewish collaborator in the Holocaust in Slovakia

Karol Hochberg (1911–1944, also Karl or Karel) was a collaborator during the Holocaust, who led the "Department for Special Affairs" within the Ústredňa Židov, the Judenrat in Bratislava which was created by the Nazis to direct the Jewish community of Slovakia.

== Life ==
Hochberg was born in Hungary in 1911 and studied in Vienna and Prague. He moved to Slovakia in 1939. In 1940, the Slovak Jews were forced to form the Ústredňa Židov (ÚŽ), a Judenrat, to implement Nazi orders. Most of the members of the ÚŽ had been prominent in Jewish public life before the Holocaust, and worked on public relief for Jews who had been dispossessed by anti-Jewish measures. However, the ÚŽ's reputation was harmed by the Jews within it who informed or collaborated, of whom Hochberg was the most notorious, according to YIVO (Institute for Jewish Research). In early 1941, the first head of the ÚŽ was deposed and arrested for sabotaging a census of Jews in eastern Slovakia with an aim to remove them to the west of the country. His replacement was an ineffectual schoolteacher named Arpad Sebestyen, who took a position of complete collaboration with the Germans. Hochberg was appointed to lead the "Department for Special Affairs", which was created to ensure the prompt implementation of Dieter Wisliceny's orders; he promptly organized the census and removal, tarnishing the ÚŽ's reputation in the Jewish community. Due to Sebestyen's ineffectuality, Hochberg's department came to dominate the operations of the ÚŽ.

In 1942, Hochberg's department worked on categorizing Jews for deportation, but it did not actually draw up the lists. About 57,000 Jews, two-thirds of the population, were deported that year; only a few hundred survived. Later, Hochberg played an important role in negotiations between the Bratislava Working Group, the resistance group within the ÚŽ, and Wisliceny. Hochberg, who made regular visits to Wisliceny's office, was the only feasible option because contact with Wisliceny had to be done clandestinely. The Working Group employed him as an intermediary despite its intense dislike and distrust of Hochberg, its fear that associating with him would harm their reputations, and its belief that he was unreliable.

In November 1942, as the Working Group began to negotiate the Europa Plan with Wisliceny in an effort to save all European Jews from deportation and death, Hochberg was arrested for bribery and corruption. According to the Slovak police records, Hochberg had an illegal account in which large bribes were deposited in return for the cessation of transports. Andrej Steiner, a member of the Working Group, distrusted Hochberg and had provided the Slovak police with evidence against him. However, his colleague Michael Dov Weissmandl advocated that the Working Group try to get Hochberg released; Weissmandl believed that he was useful and was concerned that he would reveal the negotiations. The leader of the Working Group, Gisi Fleischmann, sided with Steiner, and the Working Group did not intervene on Hochberg's behalf. Imprisoned at Nováky labor camp and later Ilava prison, Hochberg escaped during the Slovak National Uprising and joined the partisans. He was executed as a collaborator by Jewish partisans.

== Bibliography ==
- Bauer, Yehuda (1994). Jews for Sale?: Nazi-Jewish Negotiations, 1933–1945. New Haven: Yale University Press. ISBN 9780300059137.
- Bauer, Yehuda (2002). Rethinking the Holocaust. New Haven: Yale University Press. ISBN 978-0300093001.
- Bauer, Yehuda (2006). "Rudolf Vrba und die Auschwitz-Protokolle: Eine Antwort auf John S. Conway" [Rudolf Vrba and the Auschwitz Protocols: an answer to John S. Conway]. Vierteljahrshefte für Zeitgeschichte (in German). 54 (4): 701–710. doi:10.1524/VfZg.2006.54.4.701. JSTOR 20754059. S2CID 143806992.
- Fatran, Gila (1994). "The "Working Group"". Holocaust and Genocide Studies. 8 (2). Translated by Greenwood, Naftali: 164–201. doi:10.1093/hgs/8.2.164. ISSN 8756-6583.
- Fatran, Gila (2002) [1992]. "The Struggle for Jewish Survival during the Holocaust". In Długoborski, Wacław; Tóth, Dezider; Teresa, Świebocka; Mensfelt, Jarek (eds.). The Tragedy of the Jews of Slovakia 1938-1945: Slovakia and the "Final Solution of the Jewish Question". Translated by Mensfeld, Jarek. Oświęcim and Banská Bystrica: Auschwitz-Birkenau State Museum and Museum of the Slovak National Uprising. pp. 141–162. ISBN 83-88526-15-4.
- Friling, Tuvia (2005). Arrows in the Dark: David Ben-Gurion, the Yishuv Leadership, and Rescue Attempts During the Holocaust. Vol. 1. Translated by Cummings, Ora. Madison: University of Wisconsin Press. ISBN 9780299175504.
- Kamenec, Ivan (2002) [1992]. "The Deportation of Jewish Citizens from Slovakia in 1942". In Długoborski, Wacław; Tóth, Dezider; Teresa, Świebocka; Mensfelt, Jarek (eds.). The Tragedy of the Jews of Slovakia 1938-1945: Slovakia and the "Final Solution of the Jewish Question". Translated by Mensfeld, Jarek. Oświęcim and Banská Bystrica: Auschwitz-Birkenau State Museum and Museum of the Slovak National Uprising. pp. 111–139. ISBN 83-88526-15-4.
- Rothkirchen, Livia (1998). "Czech and Slovak Wartime Jewish Leadership". In Berenbaum, Michael; Peck, Abraham (eds.). The Holocaust and history: the known, the unknown, the disputed, and the reexamined. Bloomington: Indiana University Press, United States Holocaust Memorial Museum. pp. 629-646. ISBN 978-0253333742.
