= Rena Cohen =

Activist in the Soviet Jewry movement in Canada

Rena Cohen (May 31, 1940 – Jan. 1, 2023) was a leading activist in the Soviet Jewry movement in Canada, and a Canadian journalist. From 1978 to 1983, Cohen was one of four “key leaders” in the Calgary campaign to compel the U.S.S.R. to comply with the Helsinki Accords, a human rights document it had endorsed but was said to violate. After moving to Toronto, Cohen continued her advocacy with Genya Intrator, “a key player in the Canadian Soviet Jewry movement.” As a journalist, Cohen’s writings were mainly focussed on Soviet Jewry. She was “deeply involved” with the development of The Jewish Star, Calgary’s first independent Jewish newspaper.

== Personal life ==
Cohen was born Rowena Dvorkin in Calgary to Ted Dvorkin (1910–97) and Miriam (1913–2006) née Bercov. Her paternal and maternal grandparents were born in Russia, as was her father; her mother was born in Calgary. In 1955, she graduated from Connaught School, and in 1979, completed the Library Arts Programme at Southern Alberta Institute of Technology, both in Calgary. On Feb. 16, 1960, she married businessman Myer Cohen (1936–2019), from whom she was later divorced. The couple had four children.

Cohen moved to Toronto in 1983 and started Cohen Marketing Services, a sales and marketing company. In March 1991, she made aliyah, settling in Tsfat, where she remained the rest of her life. Affiliated in Calgary during her early and married years with the Shaarey Tzedec Congregation, a Traditional synagogue which lacked a mechitza, in Tsfat she underwent a religious transformation and lived “a completely observant Jewish lifestyle”. Cohen was treated for breast cancer in 2007, and died in Tsfat.

== Soviet Jewry activism ==
The effort to secure the right of Jews to emigrate from the Soviet Union – “a twenty-five year struggle that involved hundreds of thousands of people” – was deemed "the pre-eminent task of this generation of American Jews.” A Soviet Jewish activist said that “without this support, we are lost.” Canadian efforts to secure the right of Jews to emigrate from the Soviet Union spanned the late 1960s to 1991. In Calgary, Soviet Jewish activism began in 1970, and a Calgary Committee for Soviet Jewry (CCSJ) was established in 1974.

Cohen had not “paid a great deal of attention” to the subject until, while on a Jewish organizational trip to Israel in 1978, she heard from Alexander Slepak about the efforts of his parents, Maria and Vladimir Slepak, to leave the Soviet Union. Soviet authorities arrested the Moscow couple on June 1, 1978, after they displayed a banner demanding that they be allowed to reunite with their son in Israel. On June 21, Vladimir Slepak, 50, an electrical engineer known as “the father of the Jewish emigration effort in the Soviet Union and one of the leading refuseniks,” was sentenced to five years in exile in Russia.

For the next 13 years, in Calgary and Toronto, Cohen drew public attention to the cause of Soviet Jews. In 1978, she was co-chairman of the CCSJ of the Calgary Jewish Community Council; from 1979 to 1981 she was CCSJ chairperson; in 1981, she started the short-lived Calgary Action Program for Jews in the Soviet Union.

Cohen taught a course on Soviet Jewry at the Calgary Jewish Centre, spoke locally and at Soviet Jewry conferences, and urged community members to join her in connecting directly with refuseniks by writing letters to them. She assisted in organizing a public rally in downtown Calgary for Soviet Jews, and organized another at Calgary City Hall. She had her younger son, at his bar mitzvah celebration, recognize a Soviet Jewish refusenik unable to mark such an occasion by “twinning” the event, and urged others to do likewise. Having lobbied the office of John William Thomson, her Member of Parliament, she was assured of support for the Soviet Jewry cause in Ottawa.

Among the refuseniks with whom she had direct contact, or for whom she advocated in particular, while in Calgary were: Mark Berenfield, Victor Brailovsky (born 1935), Mikhail Kosharovsky, Yosef Mendelevich (born 1947), Ida Nudel (1931–2021), Alexander and Paulina Paritsky, Anatoly Sharansky (born 1948), and Maria and Vladimir Slepak (1927–2015).

Cohen continued her Soviet Jewry advocacy after moving in 1983 to Toronto, where she associated with Moscow-born, Israeli-raised Genya Intrator (1927–2008). Intrator had been involved with the movement since 1970, and Cohen had known her at least since 1981. Intrator provided Cohen with information and guidance, so that she “became my dearest friend ... really my director”.

Cohen served as Chairman, Lifeline Letters, of the Inter-Religious Task Force for Human Rights and Religious Freedoms in the Soviet Union and Baltic States, which was the Canadian chapter of the Chicago-based group. The Canadian chapter, launched in 1983, was headed by Intrator and Maureen Giroux. Cohen was occasionally a speaker at Toronto Jewish organizations. In Oct. 1986, Cohen was in Ottawa with Intrator and the Montreal 35s (a women’s campaign for Soviet Jewry) shadowing Soviet Foreign Minister Eduard Shevardnadze during his trip to Ottawa. In March 1987, Cohen was at Intrator’s Toronto home when Ida Milgrom visited there. In September 1987, Cohen met Sharansky during his brief stopover in Toronto. She showed him a 1982 letter she had received from MP Thomson’s office concerning a letter Thomson had written to the Canadian government about Sharansky. A cover letter from Thomson’s office concluded, “Let us hope that eventually the Soviet Government will bend under constant pressure.” Sharansky wrote on it, in English, “Thanks – it worked!”

== Calgary controversy ==
In 1981, Cohen decided to send nearly her entire donation to the United Jewish Appeal that year directly to Israel via the United Israel Appeal, rather than to make the donation through the local campaign, as was customary. Her decision was based on her being told that the Calgary community was not transmitting to Israel in a timely way funds raised for Israel. Subsequent to her donation being made, the Board of Directors of the Calgary Jewish Community Council adopted a resolution, at its June 29, 1981 meeting, that “any person who chooses to withhold any portion of his/her United Jewish Appeal contribution from the local community beneficiaries should not be permitted to serve in a leadership capacity on a committee of the Community Council, or on any local beneficiary Board.” A similar resolution was reportedly approved by other Canadian communities, but in Calgary it received mostly negative comments.

At the time, Cohen was active in the Calgary Jewish community. On October 6, 1981, in light of the resolution, she was asked by the president of the Council to resign her position as head of the Council’s Soviet Jewry Committee. She declined to do so. In a written response, she called for a meeting with the president, which took place on November 17. After that meeting, Cohen was removed from her position.

Not long afterwards, Cohen started the independent Calgary Action Program for Jews in the Soviet Union. It held its first program on December 10.

== Journalism ==
Cohen’s journalism was largely an adjunct to her Soviet Jewry advocacy. During 1979–80 in Calgary, she was a columnist for the Calgary Jewish News. From 1980-83, she published news reports, commentary and letters in the Alberta Jewish Star newspapers, for which she was also Contributing Editor.

Numerous letters to the editor were published by her in Canadian newspapers. In 1978, her first approach to the Calgary Herald seeking publicity for refusenik Vladimir Slepak was rejected. She was told by Lawrie Joslin, editor of the editorial page, that they were “very frightened that by putting something in the Calgary Herald, it might impact the family in a negative way.” Upon assurance from the Slepak family in Israel that this would not be the case, the daily newspaper accepted her pieces. Letters to the editor from Cohen concerning Soviet Jews and Israel appeared in the Calgary Herald, Edmonton Journal, Calgary Albertan, Toronto Star, Toronto Globe and Mail, Winnipeg Jewish Post, and New York Jewish Week.

== Tsfat ==
After moving to Israel, where she was known as Rena Dvorkin Cohen (in Hebrew, רינה דבורקין–כהן), Cohen got “very busy” with her life and found little time for Soviet Jewry advocacy. Her focus turned to philanthropic efforts. She was the main volunteer fundraiser at Lev U’Neshama (“Heart and Soul”), which provided aid to some 3,000 financially distressed families in Tsfat, and Director, Centre for the Advancement of the Blind.

== Other ==
Zlata Ehrenstein, Soul Surfing: Navigating the Sea of Life According to Jewish Mystical Teachings (Jerusalem: Menorah Books, 2010), edited by Rena Dvorkin Cohen and E. Golden.

== Recognition ==
Boys Town Jerusalem Dinner, Calgary, Oct. 30, 1979, recognizing Myer and Rena Cohen for service to the community and to Israel
