= AJPA =

AJPA may refer to:

- Asian Journal of Public Affairs
- American Jewish Press Association
- American Journal of Physical Anthropology
