= Andrew Steiner =

American architect (1908–2009)

- Born: Endre Steiner; 22 August 1908; Dunaszerdahely, Austria-Hungary (now Dunajská Streda, Slovakia)
- Died: 2 April 2009 (aged 100); Atlanta, Georgia, United States
- Citizenship: Kingdom of Hungary (1908–1920); Czechoslovakia (1920–1939); Slovak Republic (1939–1945); Czechoslovakia (1945–1948); United States (1948–2009)
- Occupation: Architect
- Known for: Negotiating with Dieter Wisliceny as a member of the Bratislava Working Group

Andrew Steiner (22 August 1908 – 2 April 2009), also known as Endre, André, or Andrej Steiner, was a Czechoslovak-American architect who participated in Jewish resistance to the Holocaust as a member of the Bratislava Working Group, an underground Jewish organization. He played a major role in the negotiations with SS official Dieter Wisliceny to pay a ransom of $50,000 to the Nazi hierarchy which was one of the main reasons the Slovak transports to Auschwitz stopped in early 1942. Later, he negotiated a ransom payment to spare Jews from death in large parts of Europe as part of the Europa Plan. After the war, he settled in Atlanta, where he was notable for his architecture.

== Life ==
Steiner was born in a Jewish family in Dunaszerdahely, Austria-Hungary (present-day Dunajská Streda, Slovakia) and was educated at Hungarian-language schools in Eperjes (now Prešov, Slovakia) and Pozsony (Pressburg, today's Bratislava, Slovakia). Between 1925 and 1932, he studied at the German Technical University in Brno, in the Czech lands. After graduation he worked for Ernst Wiesner, but he set up his own office in 1934 after completing his apprenticeship. One of his first projects as an independent architect was an apartment building at Kamenné Square in Bratislava. With Endre Szőnyi, he published the architectural magazine Forum in Bratislava from 1931 to 1938. In 1935, he married Hetty Weiner. In 1940, Steiner was briefly imprisoned in a Nazi concentration camp. The same year, he and his wife fled to the Slovak State with their young son to escape persecution in the German-occupied Protectorate of Bohemia and Moravia.

When the Slovak State declared independence in 1939, it began to persecute Jews. Eventually, Jews were forced to form a Judenrat, known as the Ústredňa Židov (ÚŽ), in order to implement Nazi orders. Steiner worked for the ÚŽ, helping set up labor camps for Jews in hopes that the Slovak authorities would not deport them. About 4,000 Jews were in the labor camps in 1942, when two-thirds of Slovak Jews were deported; most of those in labor camps were spared. Later, Steiner became part of the resistance movement within that body, known as the Bratislava Working Group. Israeli historian Yehuda Bauer described him as "non-ideological", in contrast to the Zionist and Orthodox figures in the Working Group. Steiner played a major role in helping the Working Group bribe the Judenberater for Slovakia, SS official Dieter Wisliceny. Initially, the negotiations with Wisliceny were run through a collaborationist Jew, Karol Hochberg, who likely embezzled some of the money that the Working Group tried to use to bribe Wisliceny. Against the wishes of Rabbi Michael Dov Weissmandl, another member of the Working Group, Steiner provided the Slovak police with evidence against Hochberg, who was arrested on charges of bribery and corruption in November 1942. Weissmandl believed that Hochberg was useful, and advocated that the Working Group try to get him released; he was also concerned that Hochberg would reveal the negotiations. Gisi Fleischmann, the leader of the Working Group, sided with Steiner, and the Working Group did not intervene on Hochberg's behalf.

After Hochberg's arrest, Steiner was chosen to negotiate with Wisliceny, although Fleischmann would take over the negotiations at a later date. At this time the Working Group was trying to gather funds for the Europa Plan, a proposal to halt deportations to extermination camps in the General Government in occupied Poland for $3 million. Historians have concluded that the Nazis did not intend to release a significant number of Jews from death, but the Working Group's leaders believed that the offer was genuine. International Jewish organizations harbored doubts about the plan, but they attempted to provide the funds. However, due to Allied restrictions on currency transfer, the funds had to be sent illegally, and the Working Group did not receive the money the Nazis demanded in time. In September 1943, Wisliceny canceled the negotiations, claiming that it was due to the Working Group's failure to pay.

When the Slovak National Uprising broke out in August 1944, Steiner was with his family in a partisan-controlled area and was unable to return to Bratislava. He survived the war with his wife and son in hiding in the mountains. After the liberation of Slovakia in early 1945 by the Red Army, he resumed his architectural career and also ran a rehabilitation center for Jewish children with funds provided by the Joint Distribution Committee. Although he sympathized with Zionism, he chose to move to the United States after the Communist takeover of Czechoslovakia in 1948. After a brief stay in Cuba, he was offered a position as chief architect in an American studio and moved to Atlanta, Georgia in 1950. He taught urban design at what is now Georgia State University while working for the architectural firm Robert and Company Associates in the 1960s. He designed houses and the Ahavath Achim Synagogue. He was also vice president of the Urban Design Department of the American Institute of Planners. In 2009, he died in Atlanta and is buried at Oakland Cemetery; his wife and two sons predeceased him. He was the last surviving member of the Working Group.

== Legacy ==
A 1999 documentary by Brad Lichtenstein, André's Lives, chronicles Steiner's return to Slovakia with his sons to discuss his wartime experiences. In 2004, Steiner received an honorary degree from Masaryk University in Brno. Slovak architect Ratislav Udžan wrote his PhD thesis on Steiner's life and work. A cafe in Brno was named after him in 2008. A redesigned version of one of his kitchens won the Grand Prize for Kitchen of the Year in Atlanta Homes & Lifestyles.

== Literature ==
- Abraham Fuchs, The Unheeded Cry (also in Hebrew as Karati ve ein oneh) (ArtScroll History, 1984)
- David Kranzler, Thy Brothers' Blood: The Orthodox Jewish Response During the Holocaust. Brooklyn: Ktav Publishing House, 1987. ISBN 978-0-89906-858-9
- Bauer, Yehuda (1994). Jews for Sale?: Nazi-Jewish Negotiations, 1933–1945. New Haven: Yale University Press. ISBN 9780300059137.
- Rabbi Michael Ber Weissmandl, Min HaMetzar (From the Straights), in Hebrew
- Architekt Endre Steiner: arbeiten aus den Jahren 1934–1939. Fr. Kalivoda Brünn 1939. 65 s.
- Fatran, Gila (1994). "The "Working Group"". Holocaust and Genocide Studies. 8 (2). Translated by Greenwood, Naftali: 164–201. doi:10.1093/hgs/8.2.164. ISSN 8756-6583.
- Friling, Tuvia (2005). Arrows in the Dark: David Ben-Gurion, the Yishuv Leadership, and Rescue Attempts During the Holocaust. Vol. 1. Translated by Cummings, Ora. Madison: University of Wisconsin Press. ISBN 9780299175504.
- WAHLA, Ivan, ed., PELČÁK, Petr, ed. a SAPÁK, Jan, ed. Brněnští židovští architekti = Brno's Jewish architects: 1919–1939. Brno: Spolek Obecní dům, 2000. 95 s. ISBN 80-238-7188-9.

== Documentaries ==
- Petr Bok and Martin Smok (VERAfilm, Prague and Czech Television), Among Blind Fools, a three-hour video documentary about the Bratislava Working Group, including interviews with Andre Steiner in Atlanta
