= Gold train =

Gold train or Gold Train may refer to:

== Train carrying valuables ==
- Hungarian Gold Train
- Kolchak's gold train, a train with Russian Imperial gold supply last held by Admiral Kolchak
- Nazi gold train, a rumored armored train full of treasures that left Breslau (now Wrocław) in late 1944 and was lost

== Art, entertainment, and media ==
=== Film ===
- Gold Train (film), an Italian Spaghetti Western film

=== Literature ===
- The Gold Train: The Destruction of the Jews and the Looting of Hungary (2015), a non-fiction book by Ronald W. Zweig

== See also ==
- Gold laundering
- Money train
- Nazi gold
