= David Hurst =

German actor (1926–2019)

- Hurst in The Maltese Bippy, 1969
- Born: Heinrich Theodor Hirsch; 8 May 1926 (age 100); Berlin, Germany
- Died: 15 September 2019 (aged 93); Berlin, Germany
- Occupations: Actor, theatre producer
- Years active: 1948–2000

David Hurst (born Heinrich Theodor Hirsch; 8 May 1926 – 15 September 2019) was a German actor, best known for his role in the film Hello, Dolly as Rudolph the headwaiter.

== Biography ==
=== Early life and career ===
Hurst was born Heinrich Theodor Hirsch and grew up in a family of actors. As a Jewish child living in 1930s Germany, he faced persecution from the Nazi regime. After the pogroms of Kristallnacht, the British government allowed for the rescue of Jewish children from Germany, Austria, Czechoslovakia, Poland and the Free City of Danzig. He was one of the nearly 10,000 children in 1938–1939 moved with the Kindertransport to the United Kingdom. He was separated from his mother at 12 years old, and never saw her again.

Housed in a manor in Northern Ireland, he lived with other young emigrants in the care of the family of an estate manager. His first stage experience was in Belfast at a repertory theatre, where he also changed his name from Heinrich Hirsch to David Hurst. During the Second World War he joined the British army, but because of his German background he was assigned to Entertainments National Service Association, where he performed as an actor and a comedian.

His first film role was as Wolfgang Winkel in The Perfect Woman (1949), a role Hurst had previously played in the West End to critical praise. He went on to appear in many British films of the 1950s.

=== United States ===
In 1957, Hurst moved to the United States. He spent most of his time in California, but often performed on Broadway. In 1960, he created the role of Merlyn in the original Broadway production of Camelot opposite Richard Burton.

Throughout the 1950s and 1960s he played in film, television and theatre. In 1959 he received the Clarence Derwent Award, and in 1964 he was awarded the Obie Award from The Village Voice for his off-Broadway performance in A Month in the Country.

He performed in the film version of Hello, Dolly (1969) as Rudolph the headwaiter alongside Barbra Streisand and Walter Matthau. This was his most notable role in America. He also had roles in the films Kelly's Heroes (1970) and The Boys From Brazil (1978). Hurst also appeared in numerous TV series including Mission: Impossible, Serpico and Star Trek.

Throughout his career he worked as a visiting professor at Yale, Boston University and Carnegie Mellon.

=== Return to Germany ===
In the 1980s he appeared in several German-American co-productions, and visited his half-brother Wolfgang Heinz in East Berlin. Hurst decided to remain in Germany, and worked in Vienna and Berlin with a fellow erstwhile emigrant (and Actors Studio colleague), theatre director George Tabori. From 1991 Hurst worked at the Burgtheater, Vienna, eventually returning to live in Berlin in 2000, when he retired from acting. He died there on 15 September 2019 after suffering a stroke and pneumonia.

== Appearances ==
=== Theatre ===
Play	Role	Theatre	Dates
A Midsummer Night's Dream	Ensemble	Broadway	21 September – 17 October 1954
Look After Lulu!	The Policeman	Broadway	3 March – 4 April 1959
Under The Sycamore Tree	The Scientist	Cricket Theatre	7 March – 10 April 1960; 41 performances
Camelot	Merlyn	Broadway	3 December 1960 – 5 January 1963
The Lunatic View	Young Man	Lucille Lortel Theatre	November 1962
A Month in the Country	Ignaty Ilyitch Shpigelsky	Maidman Playhouse	1963 – 1964; 48 performances
Electra	Paedagogus	Delacorte Theater	5 – 29 August 1964; 22 performances (New York Shakespeare Festival)
Henry IV	Dr. Dionysius Genoni	Broadway	28 April – 28 May 1973
Dracula	Abraham Van Helsing	Broadway	20 October 1977 – 6 January 1980
The Faithful Brethren of Pitt Street	Joseph Knaitsch	Orpheum Theatre	5 – 20 November 1988; 20 performances

=== Films ===
Year	Title	Role	Notes
1949	The Perfect Woman	Wolfgang Winkel	
1950	Tony Draws a Horse	Ivan	
1950	Soho Conspiracy	Franco	
1951	Smart Alec	Poppi	
1952	So Little Time	Blumel / Baumann	
1952	Old Mother Riley Meets the Vampire	Mugsy	
1952	Venetian Bird	Minelli	
1952	Top Secret	Professor Deutsch	
1953	Rough Shoot	Lex	
1953	Always a Bride	Beckstein	
1954	River Beat	Paddy McClure	
1954	Mad About Men	Signor Mantalini	
1955	One Good Turn	Professor Dofee	
1955	As Long as They're Happy	Dr. Hermann Schneider	
1955	All for Mary	M. Victor	
1956	The Intimate Stranger	Dave Pearson	Uncredited
1957	After the Ball	Perelli	
1964	The Confession	Gustave	
1968	How to Steal the World	Dr. Jan Vanovech	(archive footage)
1969	The Maltese Bippy	Dr. Charles Strauss	
1969	Hello, Dolly!	Rudolph Reizenweber	
1970	Kelly's Heroes	Col. Dankhopf	
1973	Orville and Wilbur (The Wright Brothers (film))	Chanute	
1978	The Boys from Brazil	Strasser	

=== Television ===
Year	Title	Role	Notes
1956	The Adventures of Aggie	Lazareff	Episode: "Snap Judgment"
1957	Armstrong Circle Theatre	Government official	Episode: "The Shepherd of Paris"
1958	DuPont Show of the Month	Mr. Stryver	Episode: "A Tale of Two Cities"
1958	Kraft Television Theatre		2 Episodes: "Riddle of a Lady" and "Next Door to Death"
1960	Play of the Week		2 Episodes: "Tiger at the Gates" and "The Emperor's Clothes"
1960	Dow Hour of Great Mysteries	Baron	Episode: "The Dachet Diamonds"
1962	Car 54, Where Are You?	Robin Stuart, playwright	Episode: "That's Show Business"
1964	The Defenders	Dr. Schaeffer	Episode: "Drink Like a Lady"
1965	Look Up and Live		2 Episodes: "The Initiation" and "The Judgment"
1965	The Man from U.N.C.L.E.	Dr. Leland Mayes Elmont	Episode: "The Brain-Killer Affair"
1965	The Patty Duke Show	Dennis Latouche	Episode: "It Takes a Heap of Livin'"
1966	Hawk	Louis Anselmi	Episode: "The Longleat Chronicles"
1966	The Girl from U.N.C.L.E.	Matthew Brecker	Episode: "The Mata Hari Affair"
1967	Hallmark Hall of Fame	Petrovini	Episode: "Anastasia"
1967	Mission: Impossible	Victor Grigov	Episode: "The Astrologer"
1967	Mannix	Vladek	Episode: "The Many Deaths of Saint Christopher"
1968	To Die in Paris	Pirot	TV movie
1968	The Man from U.N.C.L.E.	Dr. Jan Vanovech	Episode: "The Seven Wonders of the World Affair"
1968	It Takes a Thief	Captain Kovich	Episode: "When Boy Meets Girl"
1968	The Monkees	The Baron	Episode: "Monkees Race Again"
1968	The Flying Nun	Gus Mendoza – Sister Sixto's Uncle	Episode: "A Fish Story"
1968	Run for Your Life	Heinrich Kleist	Episode: "The Exchange"
1969	Star Trek	Hodin	Episode: "The Mark of Gideon"
1969	Mission: Impossible	Dr. Oswald Beck	Episode: "The Test Case"
1969	The Flying Nun	Benito Gomez	Episode: "The Lottery"
1970	The Mod Squad	Consulate General Fohgib	Episode: "The Exile"
1970	The F.B.I.	Alex Keeler	Episode: "The Traitor"
1971	Dark Shadows	Justin Collins	3 episodes
1971	NET Playhouse	Chanute	Episode: "The Wright Brothers"
1976	Serpico	Ducek	Episode: "The Indian"
1977	Nero Wolfe	Fritz	TV film broadcast 1979
1977	McCloud	Colonel Andrei Krasnavian	Episode: "The Moscow Connection"
1977	Insight		Episode: "Arnstein's Miracle"
1978	Child of Glass	Jacques Dumaine	TV film
1978	Eight Is Enough		Episode : "The Hipbone's Connected to the Thighbone"
1978	Quincy, M.E.	Dr. Fred Webber	Episode: "Dead and Alive"
1979	Ryan's Hope	Dr. Nelson	Uncredited, 1 episode
1980	Charlie's Angels	Stovich	Episode: "Angel in Hiding"
1981	Skokie	Sol Goldstein	TV film, (final film role)
