= Arnold Ages =

Canadian-born American scholar (1935–2020)

Arnold Ages (17 May 1935 – 9 October 2020) was a Canadian-born scholar, author, editor and journalist. As an academic, he published 90 scholarly articles and books between 1956 and 2001, not limited to his specialty of French Enlightenment literature. As a journalist, his newspaper publications spanned over five decades and included book reviews, editorials, opinion pieces, interviews, and reports for journals across Canada and the United States. His views were conservative, strongly supportive of the State of Israel, and traditionally Jewish. He preferred discretion to controversy.

Ages was notable for his ability to write for academic as well as general audiences. Likewise unusual was his appeal to newspaper publications in both Canada and the United States.

== Life ==
Ages was born and raised in Ottawa, Ontario. He graduated from Nepean High School in 1953. He received his B.A. degree from Ottawa's Carleton University in 1956, studied at the Hebrew University in Jerusalem (1958), and was awarded graduate degrees from Ohio State University (M.A., 1958, PhD, 1963). At Carleton, he studied religion under Rabbi Simon L. Eckstein, of Congregation Beth Shalom (Orthodox), Ottawa.

Ages was married to Shoshana Ages (who wrote under the pseudonym "Rose Kleiner") in 1960, and dedicated his doctoral thesis to her.

== Academic and scholarly career ==
Ages became an assistant professor of French at the University of Waterloo in 1963, and was later associate dean of arts. He retired in 2003 and in the following year was named Distinguished Emeritus at Waterloo. He afterwards lectured on French literature during the winter months at the Fort Lauderdale, Florida campus of Nova Southeastern University.

In 1970, Ages was appointed Canada's first synagogue scholar-in-residence at Beth Tzedec Congregation in Toronto. There he came in contact with some of the leading Jewish figures of the time, all of whom were living in Toronto: Stuart E. Rosenberg (the Beth Tzedec rabbi), Walter Wurzburger (rabbi of the Orthodox Shaarei Shomayim), Gunther Plaut (rabbi at the Reform Holy Blossom), and Emil Fackenheim (the University of Toronto Hegel scholar and philosopher of the Holocaust).

== Journalism career ==
Ages’ entry into the journalism field began in 1964 when, having earned his doctorate, he wrote for the New York Jewish Spectator, Reconstructionist, and Hadassah Magazine.

In April 1972, Ages became the editor of the Chronicle Review (originally the Canadian Jewish Review), which was then a monthly magazine. Attracting well-known Canadian writers such as Irving Layton and William Kurelek, the Chronicle Review became known for providing “high-quality reading for the Jewish public.” But the monthly soon ran a deficit, and closed in November 1976. Ages declined a request at the time to become editor of the Canadian Jewish News.

In Canada, his articles appeared in daily newspapers such as the Montreal Gazette and Toronto Star, as well as in publications including the Toronto Jewish Standard, the Canadian Jewish News, Canadian Zionist, Vancouver Jewish Western Bulletin, Winnipeg Jewish Post, Calgary Jewish Star, Edmonton Jewish Star, and B'nai B'rith Canada's Jewish Tribune.

In the United States book reviews and articles appeared in newspapers such as the Chicago Tribune, Los Angeles Times, and The Baltimore Sun, and in Jewish publications (besides those already cited) such as the Indiana Jewish Post and Opinion, Chicago Jewish Star, Philadelphia Jewish Exponent, B'nai B'rith National Jewish Monthly, and Washington, D.C. Bible Review. He was a stringer for the Jewish Telegraphic Agency from 1983 to 1984, and an occasional contributor in later years. Ages occasionally used the pseudonym "Harold Jacobson".

== Recognition ==
During his academic career, Ages received seven Canada Council grants. In 1984, he was a Killam Fellowship award winner, the first-ever at the University of Waterloo. In the journalism field, in 1973 he received a Smolar Award for editorials and columns.

== Selected works ==
1969: French Enlightenment and Rabbinic Tradition (appeared in English and German)

1973: The Diaspora Dimension

1986: The Image of Jews and Judaism in the Prelude of the French Enlightenment
