= The Jewish Star =

The Jewish Star may refer to:

- The Jewish Star (Alberta), a Canadian Jewish newspaper
- The Jewish Star (New York), an American Jewish newspaper

== See also ==
- Star of David, a Jewish symbol sometimes known as the "Jewish Star"
