= Jozef Sivák =

Slovak politician (1886-1959)

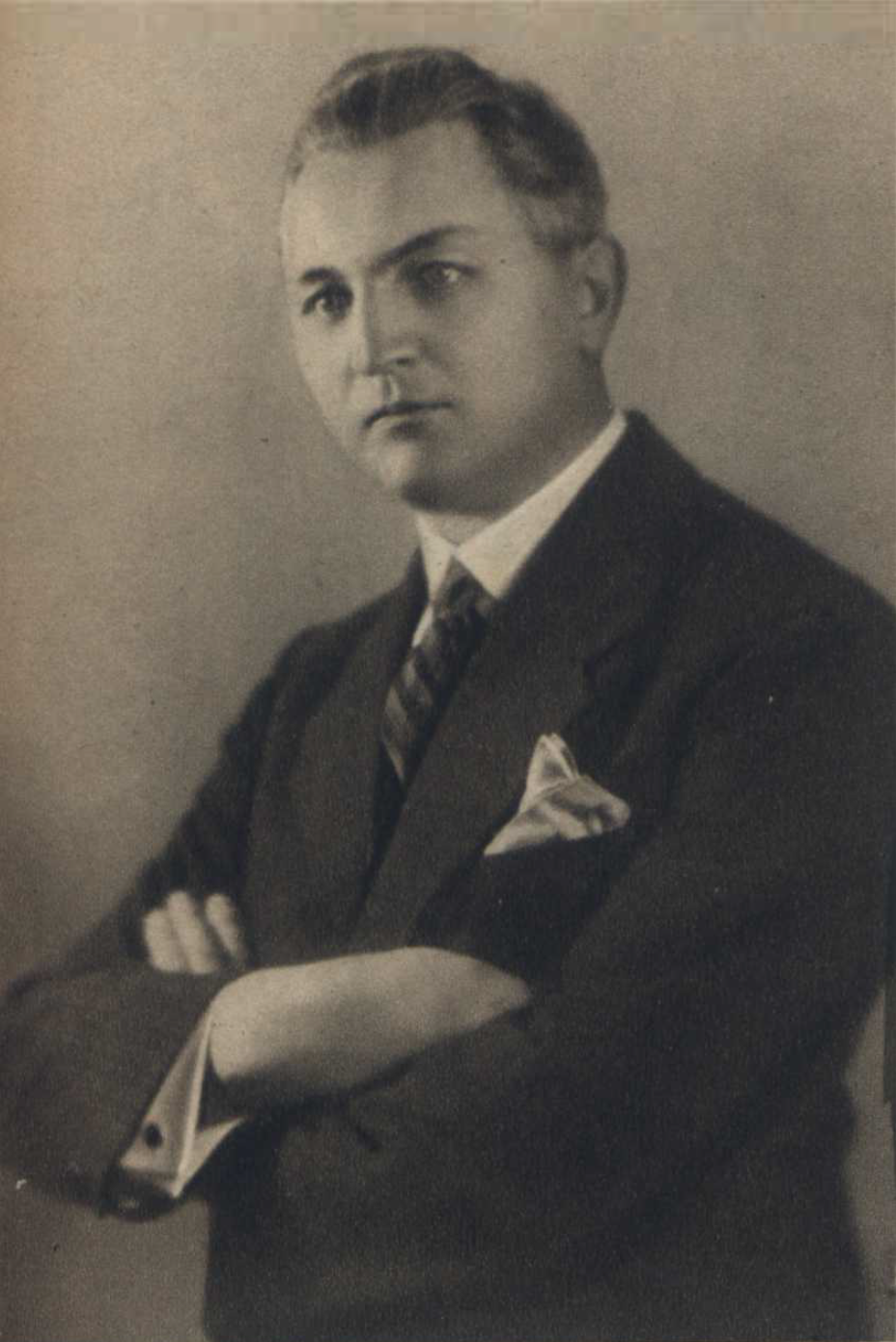
Jozef Sivák

Jozef Sivák (14 January 1886, in Bobrovec – 27 January 1959, in Bratislava) was the Prime Minister of the Autonomy Government of Slovakia of the Second Czechoslovak Republic from 9 March 1939 to 11 March 1939. He was a member of the HSĽS and the minister of education of the Nazi Slovak State from 1939 to 1944.

== See also ==
- Prime Minister of Slovakia
