= The Wright Brothers (film) =

The Wright Brothers is a 1971 American NET Playhouse TV movie about the Wright brothers. It stars real-life brothers James Keach and Stacy Keach in the title roles, Wilbur and Orville. This gave them the idea to play Frank and Jesse James, which led to The Long Riders (1980).

Made by Arthur Barron. With David Hurst as Octave Chanute and George Mitchell as Bishop Wright, their father.
