= Bobrovec =

- Municipality
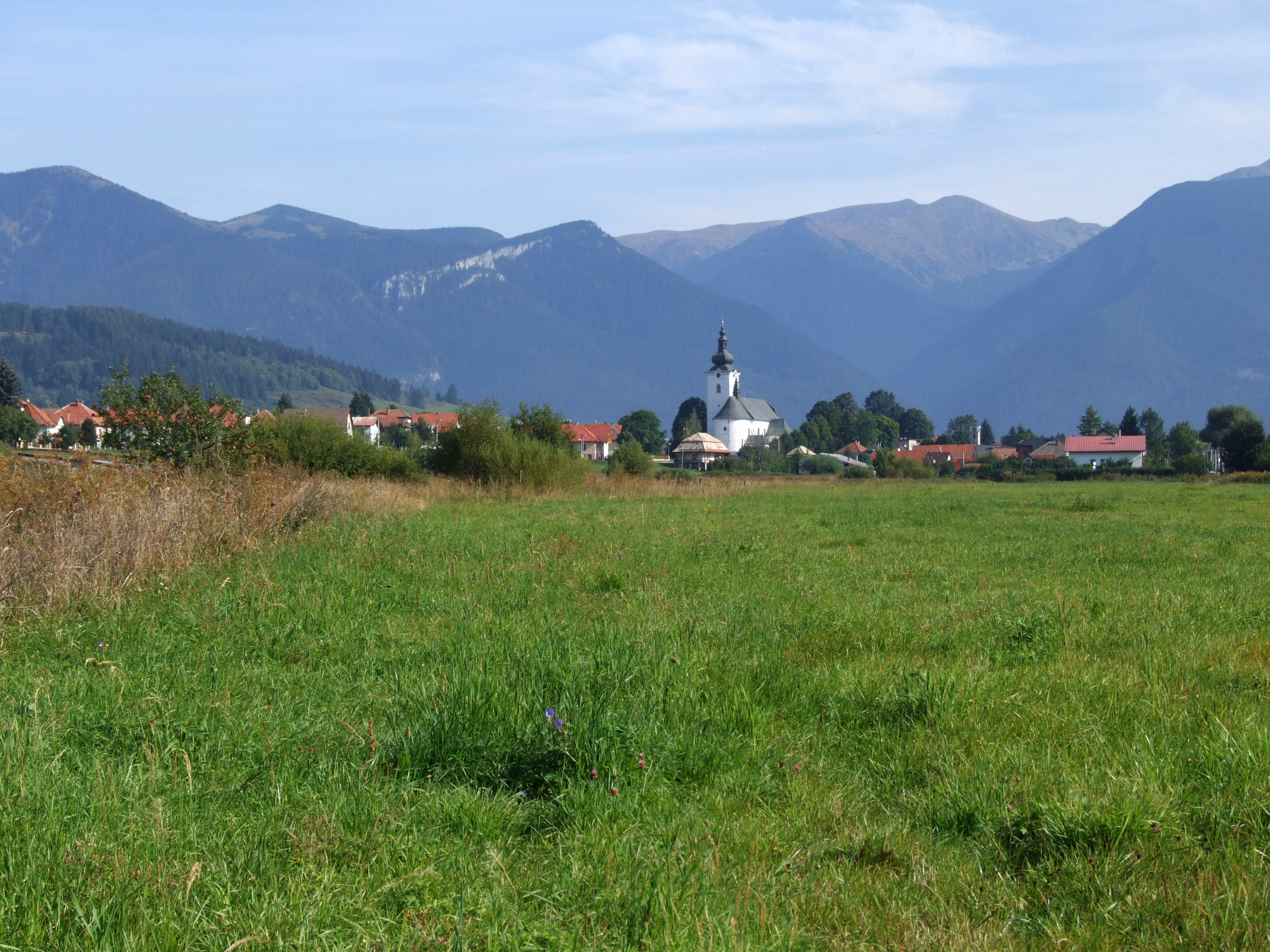

- Flag

- Location of Bobrovec in the Žilina Region Location of Bobrovec in Slovakia
- Coordinates: 49.12°N 19.62°E
- Country: Slovakia
- Region: Žilina Region
- District: Liptovský Mikuláš District
- First mentioned: 1231

Area
  - Total: 31.14 km^{2} (12.02 sq mi)
- Elevation: 635 m (2,083 ft)

Population (2025)
  - Total: 2,007
- Time zone: UTC+1 (CET)
  - Summer (DST): UTC+2 (CEST)
- Postal code: 322 1
- Area code: +421 44
- Vehicle registration plate (until 2022): LM
- Website: www.bobrovec.eu

Bobrovec (Hungarian: Nagybobróc) is a village and municipality in Liptovský Mikuláš District in the Žilina Region of northern Slovakia.

== History ==
In historical records the village was first mentioned in 1231. Before the establishment of independent Czechoslovakia in 1918, it was part of Liptó County within the Kingdom of Hungary. From 1939 to 1945, it was part of the Slovak Republic.

== Geography ==
The municipality lies at an altitude of 635 metres (2,083 ft) and covers an area of 31.14 km^{2} (12.02 sq mi) (2025).

== Population ==
Population statistic (10 years)
Year	1995	2005	2015	2025
Count	1820	1783	1879	2007
Difference		−2.03%	+5.38%	+6.81%

Population statistic
Year	2024	2025
Count	1984	2007
Difference		+1.15%

It has a population of 2007 people (31 December 2025).

=== Ethnicity ===
Census 2021 (1+ %)
Ethnicity	Number	Fraction
Slovak	1933	97.42%
Not found out	42	2.11%
Total	1984	

In year 2021 was 1984 people by ethnicity 1933 as Slovak, 42 as Not found out, 15 as Czech, 13 as Other, 5 as Ukrainian, 4 as Romani, 4 as Rusyn, 4 as Polish, 2 as Vietnamese, 1 as Silesian, 1 as Russian, 1 as Hungarian, 1 as Canadian, 1 as French, 1 as English and 1 as Albanian.

Note on population: The difference values of population numbers in the table "Population statistic" and in the sections "Ethnicity" & "Religion" is caused by the use of various statistical methods.

=== Religion ===
Census 2021 (1+ %)
Religion	Number	Fraction
Roman Catholic Church	1337	67.39%
None	438	22.08%
Evangelical Church	113	5.7%
Not found out	40	2.02%
Greek Catholic Church	21	1.06%
Total	1984	

In year 2021 was 1984 people by religion 1337 from Roman Catholic Church, 438 from None, 113 from Evangelical Church, 40 from Not found out, 21 from Greek Catholic Church, 10 from Other, 6 from Ad hoc movements, 4 from Other and not ascertained christian church, 4 from Jehovah's Witnesses, 4 from Buddhism, 3 from Eastern Orthodox Church, 2 from Paganism and natural spirituality, 1 from Calvinist Church and 1 from Christian Congregations in Slovakia.

== Notable people ==
The ski mountaineer Jozef Hlavco was born in Bobrovec.

== Genealogical resources ==
The records for genealogical research are available at the state archive "Statny Archiv in Bytca, Slovakia"

- Roman Catholic church records (births/marriages/deaths): 1732-1900 (parish A)
- Lutheran church records (births/marriages/deaths): 1844-1895 (parish B)

== See also ==
- List of municipalities and towns in Slovakia
