= Sol Goldstein =

American Zionist activist (1914–1992)

- Born: March 30, 1914; Yurburg, Kovno Governorate
- Died: September 3, 1992 (aged 78)
- Known for: Jewish community leader Zionist activist Philanthropist
- Spouse: Tamara Goldstein

Sol Goldstein (March 30, 1914 – September 3, 1992) was a leader in the Chicago Jewish community, a Zionist activist and a philanthropist. He survived imprisonment by Nazi Germany in World War II, and later moved to the US.

== Biography ==
=== Early years ===
Goldstein was born in Yurburg, in the Kovno Governorate of the Russian Empire (present-day Lithuania), a town with a heavily Jewish population dating back to the 14th century. "My Yurburg is full of love for the people of Israel and the love of one person for another," Goldstein reminisced. In the summer of 1941, Yurburg was occupied by the German army, and that September the Nazis murdered the town's Jews, which included Goldstein's entire family. Goldstein was imprisoned by the Nazis for three years, and later fought with the partisans. In 1949, Goldstein came to the United States with his wife Tamara, eventually purchasing the Harry J. Bosworth dental supply company in Skokie, Illinois.

=== Jewish communal and Zionist involvement ===
During the 1960s and after, Goldstein served in many leadership positions in the Chicago Jewish community. He was head of the Sheerith Hapleitah, a Chicago-area Holocaust survivors association; Israel Bonds; chairman of the public affairs committee of the Jewish United Fund (JUF) of Metropolitan Chicago; president of the Zionist Organization of Chicago and president of the Chicago Zionist Federation. In 1968, Goldstein was included on the dais with Mayor Richard J. Daley in welcoming Israeli leader Golda Meir to Chicago; in 1976, Goldstein introduced then-Israeli Prime Minister Yitzhak Rabin at a lavish Chicago solidarity dinner; in 1978, he addressed a similar Chicago gathering for Israeli Prime Minister Menachem Begin.

== Controversies ==
=== Attempted neo-Nazi march in Skokie ===
In 1976, Frank Collin and his neo-Nazi National Socialist Party of America (NSPA) held anti-black demonstrations in Marquette Park, Chicago. In an intentionally provocative declaration in February 1977, Collin announced that he and as many as 50 NSPA supporters in neo-Nazi uniform and displaying swastikas were going to assemble in front of the Skokie Village Hall. An estimated 18% of the village's residents were Holocaust survivors.

The Village of Skokie attempted to prevent the assembly in the town by requiring a $350,000 bond and other actions, moves opposed by Collin and the Illinois Division of the American Civil Liberties Union. In a hearing on the case in Chicago on April 28, 1977, Goldstein served as a primary witness in the same courtroom with Collin. When asked if he would attack Collin if the NSPA demonstration took place, Goldstein answered, "I may." Goldstein – who said he expected 50,000 people to attend a counter-demonstration to any NSPA rally in Skokie – soon became known as the one who was leading "the fight to stop American Nazis from marching in the Chicago suburb." Goldstein v. Collin, his lawsuit to stop the NSPA assembly, failed, as did Village of Skokie actions.

=== Court battle over uncollected pledges ===
About three months after Goldstein died in 1992, leaving an estate valued at $5.1 million, the Jewish United Fund of Metropolitan Chicago contacted Goldstein's daughters, asserting that he had left unpaid $660,000 which he was said to have orally pledged to that nonprofit group. During his lifetime, he had donated $1.6 million to the JUF. The JUF sought payment of the pledges, a move said to be without precedent among Jewish federations in the United States.

The Goldstein heirs rejected the JUF request for payment, and on January 25, 1993, JUF v. Estate of Sol Goldstein was filed in Cook County Circuit Court. In November 1993, the JUF's claim was upheld. At the same time, the JUF announced that it was prepared to sue Russian immigrants in default on almost $1 million in loan repayments.

Meanwhile, the JUF argued that 81 of 82 board members supported its legal action against the Goldstein estate, though opinion in the Jewish community overwhelmingly disapproved of its stance. According to an unscientific poll, nearly three-quarters of respondents to a survey said they believed the Jewish United Fund should not have undertaken court action to retrieve the pledges. Letters on the subject ran in four issues of the Chicago Jewish Star, a local newspaper, and an editorial claimed that "neither of the principals were winners in this case."

On April 4, 1995, the JUF announced that "an amicable settlement" with "strictly confidential" terms had been reached between it and the "executors and beneficiaries" of the Goldstein estate.
