= Vyhne labor camp =

Vyhne was a labor camp in the Slovak Republic that existed from 1940 to 1944. Several hundred Slovak jews were prisoners.
