= Calgary Jewish News =

Canadian Jewish newspaper

- Front page of the October 1979 issue of Calgary Jewish News
- Type: Free monthly newspaper
- Format: Tabloid
- Publisher: Calgary Jewish Community Council
- Founded: 1962
- Ceased publication: 1988
- Headquarters: Calgary, Alberta; Canada

Calgary Jewish News, the first community-run newspaper of the Jewish community of Calgary, Alberta, was published from September 1962 to 1988.

== History ==
=== Origins ===
The first known Jewish settler arrived in Calgary in 1889, but it was not until 1954 that a Jewish community council was launched. The Calgary Jewish Community Council, which united 17 disparate organizations, is considered to date back to 1962. In that year, Harry S. Shatz was hired as the council's first executive director. By 1961, Calgary's Jewish population had grown from around 400 families in 1930 to an estimated 2,881 people.

In the early 1960s, most Canadian Jewish newspapers and magazines were independently owned and operated. The purpose of the monthly, tabloid-sized Calgary Jewish News, according to Shatz, its first editor, was to unite the community and eliminate the redundancy of competing organizational publications.

=== Expansion ===
At the end of the 1970s, Calgary Jewish News expanded beyond its initial purpose. In 1979, it published articles in Russian, Hebrew, and Yiddish, reflecting the growth and diversity of the community; in 1980, it began subscribing for the first time to the Jewish Telegraphic News Service, and also published a 24-page edition, its largest ever.

=== Competition ===
By 1980, Canadian Jewish communities "were moving to take-over Jewish weeklies," but the trend was reversed in Calgary with the appearance that year of The Jewish Star, the city's first independent Jewish newspaper. The ensuing uneasy relationship between the organized Calgary Jewish leadership and the independent Jewish Star mirrored tensions playing out in the 1980s and 1990s in Los Angeles, New York, Toronto and elsewhere between a free press and Jewish federations. For the first time, the Calgary Council saw reports from within the community which it deemed unflattering.

In 1982, in a move that saved the Council thousands of dollars on mailing costs, the Calgary Jewish News was inserted into, and delivered by mail with, The Jewish Star.

=== Closing ===
Calgary Jewish News was discontinued in 1988, and followed by the Calgary Jewish Community Council's newsletter, Dor L'Dor.

== Editors ==
Calgary Jewish News was edited by Harry S. Shatz from September 1962 to September 1978. Subsequent individuals named in the publication as editor included Gil August (1978–79); Douglas Wertheimer (1979–80); Avrim Namak (1980-82); and Rose Suissa (1981).
