= Tuvia Friling =

Israeli researcher in the study of Israel and Zionism

- טוביה פרילינג
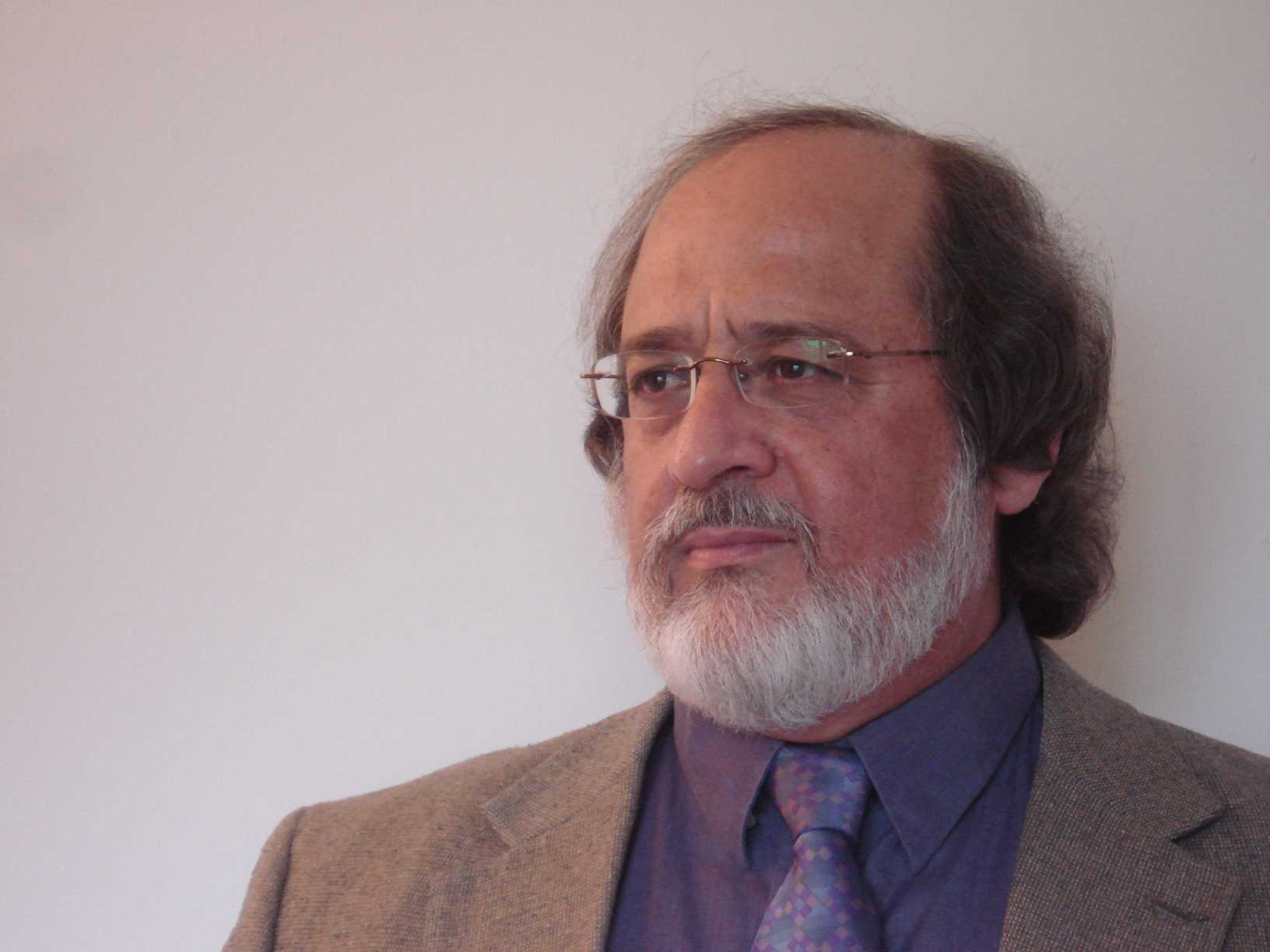
- Tuvia Friling, 2008
- Born: 7 May 1953 (age 73); Beer Sheba, Israel
- Education: Hebrew University of Jerusalem
- Scientific career
- Fields: History
- Workplaces: Ben-Gurion University of the Negev
- Doctoral advisor: Yehuda Bauer

Tuvia Friling (Hebrew: טוביה פרילינג; born 7 May 1953) is an Emeritus professor at Ben-Gurion University of the Negev, Israel. Previously he served as a senior researcher at the Ben-Gurion Research Institute for the Study of Israel and Zionism and a lecturer at the Israel Studies Program both at Ben-Gurion University of the Negev.

== Biography and early academic career ==
Tuvia Friling's parents with his elder brother and two sisters immigrated to Israel in 1951 from Bârlad, Romania. Arriving in Israel, the family, which had been prosperous in Romania, was first housed in a maabara (transit camp for new immigrants) in Beer Sheba. A year later they moved to a small apartment in a new neighborhood of the developing town. Tuvia Friling was born in Beer Sheba in 1953, two years after his family's arrival in Israel. In 1967, after completing elementary school in his hometown, he enrolled in the Jerusalem May Boyer boarding school for gifted students.

In 1971 he was drafted into the army and served as a squad commander in the 890 Paratroopers Battalion. In August 1973 he completed officer training and was deployed as platoon commander in the Golani Brigade's training base. During the 1973 Yom Kippur War he participated in two attempts to re-capture Mount Hermon, and fought in other battles on the Golan Heights. During the attrition war that followed and until the end of his regular military service he was deputy company commander in Golani. He continued to do reserve duty, eventually rising to the rank of major.

Friling received his B.A. with honors at the Ben-Gurion University in 1979 in Jewish and General History. For the four following years, 1979–1983, he taught history at a Beer-Sheba High School and worked as instructor for the teaching of history at Ben-Gurion University's teacher training program. He did his graduate studies at the Institute of Contemporary Jewry at the Hebrew University, Jerusalem, where he completed his Master's degree with honors in 1984 (the topic of his thesis was "Ben-Gurion's Role in the Rescue Attempts of Children and in the Absorption Controversy") and received his Ph.D. in 1991 (the topic of his dissertation was "Ben-Gurion and the Destruction of European Jewry 1939–1945"). Both dissertations were supervised by Yehuda Bauer.

== Prizes ==
Friling was awarded the 1999 Mordechai Ish Shalom Prize for his book Arrows in the Dark: David Ben-Gurion, the Yishuv Leadership and Rescue Attempts during the Holocaust; in 2001 he received the Prime Minister's Prize – the most prominent Prize awarded by the State Council for the Commemoration of Presidents and Prime Ministers. Additional Prizes: the David Tuviahu Prize of Yad Ben-Gurion; the Esther Parnas Prize of Yad Vashem, Jerusalem; the Denis Blum Prize of Ben-Gurion University of the Negev; the Fridan Prize of the Hebrew University of Jerusalem; the Hillel Kook Memorial Prize of the Institute for Mediterranean Affairs.

== Academic positions and professional career ==
Friling began his academic career at Ben-Gurion University in 1977 as an instructor and research assistant, and has been teaching at the university ever since. During 1983–1991 he was a researcher at the Ben-Gurion Research Center as well as the director of the Ben-Gurion Archives. During 1993–2001 he served as director of the Ben-Gurion Heritage Institute and the Ben-Gurion Research Center in the university's Sde Boqer Campus. He initiated and in cooperation with the university's Computation center, established the digitalized Ben-Gurion Archive – a world class computerized archive and database that provides online access using full text retrieval software. For his accomplishments as the head of the Ben-Gurion institutes he was awarded the Prime Minister's Prize.

In the years 2001–2004 Friling served as Israel's State Archivist. In this position he initiated a plan for upgrading Israel's archives system. The program's mainstays were: the construction of permanent quarters in Jerusalem housing the State Archives; the creation of a central modern storage center in the Negev for the archival holdings; the computerization of the State Archives and the creation of a computerized network of all Israel's public archives; the creation of the infrastructure and organization for the preservation of the State of Israel's computerized documentation and its conversion with the advent of new technological generations; the updating of the Israeli Archives' Law, shortening of the classification period, changes in the practice of destruction of the documentation in order to expand and enrich the quantity and variety of documentation that is preserved for perpetuity; and the establishment of a national Authority for Archives and Public Records.

In the years 2003–2004 Friling was one of the three co-vice chairs of the International Commission on the Holocaust in Romania, chaired by Nobel Prize Laureate Elie Wiesel.

Friling was a visiting scholar in various academic institutes in Israel and abroad: 1992–1993 at the Meyerhoff Center for Hebrew and Jewish Studies at University of Maryland, College Park; 1996 at the Center for Hebrew and Jewish Studies, Yarnton, Oxford; 1999–2000 at the International Institute for Holocaust Research, Yad Vashem, Jerusalem and the Yitzhak Rabin Center, Tel Aviv; 2002–2004 at the Shalem Center, Jerusalem; 2006–2007 at the Center of Advanced Holocaust Studies, United States Holocaust Memorial Museum, Washington DC; 2007–2008 at the Gildenhorn Institute for Israel Studies, University of Maryland; 2013–2014 at the Schusterman center for Israel studies, Brandeis university, Waltham, USA.

Friling has been on the editorial boards of several academic journals: Iyunim Bitkumat Israel - Studies in Zionism, the Yishuv and the State of Israel, published by the Ben-Gurion Research Institute; Israel Studies, published by the Ben-Gurion Research Institute and Brandeis University; and Shvut, published by the Diaspora Research Center of Tel Aviv University and the Ben-Gurion Research Institute.

== Research interests ==
Friling's research interest focuses on the Zionist leadership's role in the nation building processes in the pre-state Yishuv and the State of Israel, as well as on David Ben-Gurion's leadership during that period and the ensemble of his decision making and strategic moves before and after the establishment of the State of Israel. In addition, Friling explored the Yishuv leadership's role in rescue attempts during the Holocaust and the impact of these issues on questions pertaining to Israeli identity. His book "Arrows in the Dark—David Ben-Gurion, the Yishuv leadership, and rescue attempts during the Holocaust" (University of Wisconsin–Madison, 2005) analyzes the Yishuv's rescue efforts during the Holocaust and provides a detailed account of the scope and complexities of the activities carried out by David Ben-Gurion and the Yishuv leadership during that period.

Friling also dealt with post-Zionism and the roots of the controversy between so-called new historians and critical sociologists and "establishment" historians and sociologists. His article: The Seventh Million as the Zionist Movement's March of Folly, was published in 1992 and was among the first attempts to grapple with this controversy. Further contributions to this debate were an article he co-authored with Yehuda Bauer published in Iton 77, and a book he edited, An Answer to a Post-Zionist Colleague – a compilation of articles by various researchers shedding light on different perspectives of this issue.

Friling also dealt with the historical and ideological roots of the debate about Israel's social and economic policy in recent years, and with Daniel Gutwein and Avi Bareli edited a two-volume publication Society and Economy in Israel: Historical and Contemporary Perspectives.

Tuvia Friling was among Israel's pioneers in the development of computerized full-text databases of historical documentation based on modern retrieval systems. The digitalized online archive he created with his partners at the Ben-Gurion Research Institute in Sde Boqer provides research opportunities. Friling also developed teaching methods for teaching history in a research environment and by means of computerized online settings. This program served as the foundation for scores of teacher training courses entitled "The Expedition to the Isle of Story".

Friling is at present engaged in researching the activities of the Yishuv's right-wing circles during the Holocaust in illegal immigration, aid and rescue, as well as their clandestine cooperation with American, British and other intelligence services, and their post World War II involvement in illegal immigration and the building of an armed force.

== Books ==
- The Hebrew Version: An Answer to a Post-Zionist Colleague (2003). Yedioth Ahronot Publication, Tel Aviv – Hemed Books, Hebrew.
- As editor, Critique du post-sionisme, Reponse aux "nouveaux historiens" Israeliens (2004), Editions in Press Publishers, France 586pp. The Hebrew version: 2003, An Answer to a Post-Zionist Colleague, Yediot Acharonot Publication - Hemed Books, 587pp.
- As editor, with Hanna Yablonka, Israel and the Holocaust (2004), Israel Studies, a Series Subject, vol. 8, no. 3, Indiana University Press, USA, 217pp.
- Arrows in the dark: David Ben-Gurion, the Yishuv leadership, and rescue attempts during the Holocaust (2005), University of Wisconsin Press, Madison, Wisconsin, ISBN 0299175502. First published in Hebrew in 1998.
- As editor, with Radu Ioanid and Mihail Ionescu, The International Commission on the Holocaust in Romania: Final Report (2005), Polirom Publications, 416pp, in English. Romanian version: 2005, Comisia Internationala de Studiu al Holocaustului in Romania – Raport Final, Polirom Publications, 425pp.
- As editor, with Avi Bareli and Danny Gutwein, Economy and Society in Israel: Present and Historical Perspective (2005), Iyunim Bitkumat Israel, the Series Subject, the Ben-Gurion Research Institute, the Ben-Gurion University of the Negev and Yad Ben Zvi Institute, Jerusalem, 898pp.
- As editor, with Paula Kabalo and Ariel Kleiman, David Ben-Gurion - Vision y Legado, Discoursos, Articulos y Corespondencia (2008), in Spanish, Iberoamericana University Press, Mexico, 316pp.
- As Guest Editor, special issue, "The Israelis and the Holocaust", Israel Studies (March 2009), Indiana University Press, in English, 174pp.
- Who are you Leon Berger? A story of a Kapo in Auschwitz (2009). In Hebrew, Resling Press. Published in English as A Jewish Capo in Auschwitz: History, Memory and the Politics of Survival (2013), the Schusterman Center for Israel Studies, University Press of New England, Brandeis University Press, 325+xiiipp.
- As editor: David Ben-Gurion, Visits in the Valley of Death, Ben-Gurion's journeys to Bulgaria, Sweden and the displaced Persons camps in Germany, Memories, (September 1944 – October 1946), (2014), in Hebrew.
- Le-Halekh bi-Gedulot (Ambitious Moves: Cooperation between the Revisionists Zionists and Anti-Nazi Germans in the Attempt to Defeat the Third Reich) (2015). In Hebrew. The International institute for Holocaust Research, Yad Vashem, Jerusalem.
- As editor, with Gideon Katz and Michael Volpe, Music in Israel (2015), in Hebrew, 1277 + XXIIpp. Iyunim Bitkumat Israel, the Series Subject, The Ben-Gurion Research Institute, Ben-Gurion Univaersity of the Negev.
- The Web Spinner, Dr. Joseph (Joe) Schwartz and the J.D.C. Aid and Rescue Operations During WW2 and Aftermath (2022), in Hebrew, ePublish.
