= Chicago Jewish Star =

US Jewish newspaper (1991–2018)

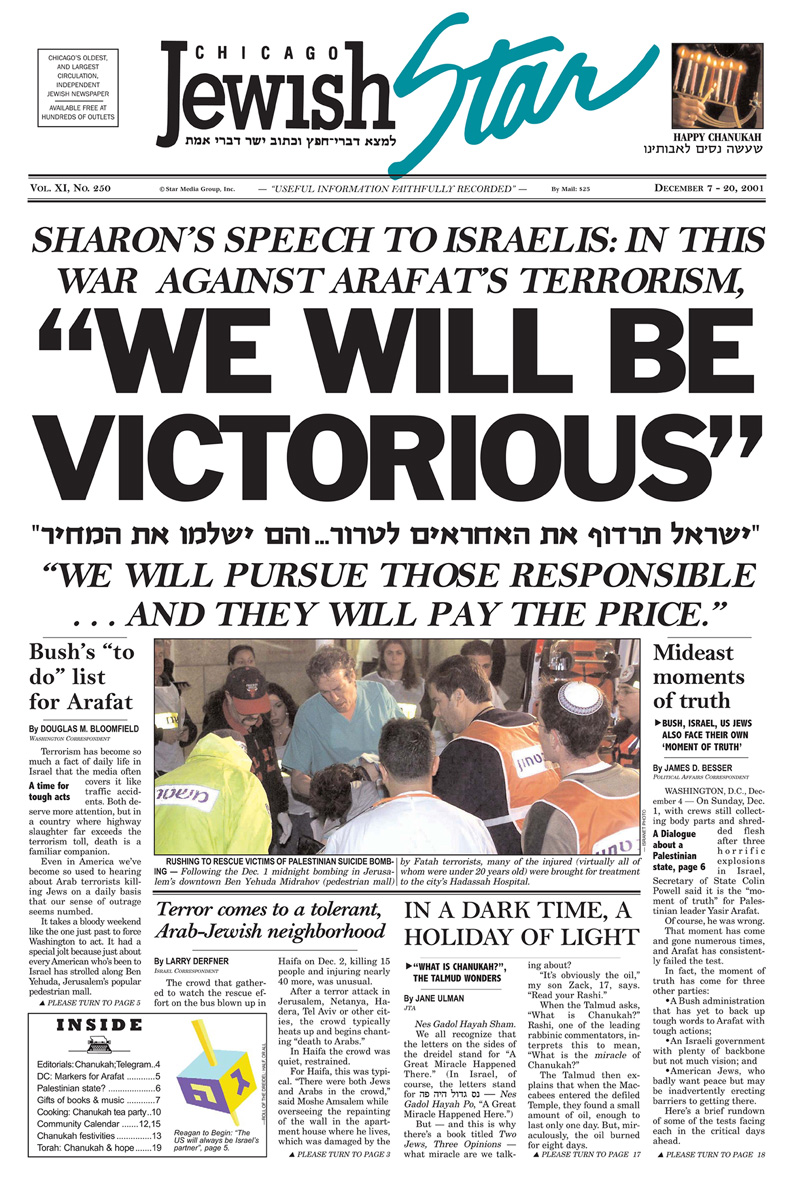
- Front page of the December 7–20, 2001, issue of the Chicago Jewish Star
- Type: Free semi-monthly newspaper
- Format: Tabloid
- Owner(s): Star Media Group, Inc.
- Editor: Douglas Wertheimer; Gila Wertheimer
- Founded: February 22, 1991
- Ceased publication: May 2, 2018
- Headquarters: Skokie, IL; United States
- Circulation: 17,500
- ISSN: 1054-1365

The Chicago Jewish Star was an independent twice-monthly general interest Jewish newspaper based in Skokie, Illinois, and published from 1991 to 2018. It provided news analysis and opinion on local, national and international events of relevance to the Jewish community, with a focus on literature and arts, politics, and the Middle East. It was a continuation of The Jewish Star, a Canadian newspaper operated by the same principals from 1980 to 1990.

== History ==
The Chicago Jewish Star was founded in 1990 by Douglas Wertheimer, editor and president of Star Media Group Inc., and Gila Wertheimer, associate editor, with its first issue appearing February 22, 1991. It entered a Chicago Jewish newspaper field dominated by the Jewish Federation-run, controlled-circulation JUF News (founded in 1972), and the long-running independent weekly The Sentinel (founded in 1911). The Jewish Star was the first new Jewish newspaper published solely for the Chicago area in nearly 75 years.

The Jewish Star was the first Jewish newspaper in Metro Chicago to receive news by fax or electronically; the first to be distributed for free at locations throughout Metro Chicago; the first to be distributed via its own street corner news boxes or City of Chicago newspaper newsrack kiosks; and the principals were the first to publish Jewish newspapers in both Canada and the United States.

After 27 years in print, the newspaper ceased publication with its May 2, 2018 issue.

== Editorial, Advertising, Circulation, Design ==
Local news, editorial, advertising and design is generated mainly in-house, with additional news and feature contributions from syndicated columnists, news services and occasionally freelance writers. The editorial position has been independent; politically, its stance has changed on some issues. Following the signing of the Oslo Accords in Washington in 1993, for example, the paper remained cautiously optimistic about Mideast peace even in the face of Palestinian violence against Israel. But by 2007, it was in the camp of those who question the two-state solution.

A tabloid-sized newspaper ranging from 12 to 36 pages, it had a circulation at its launching of 10,000 copies, rising to 20,000 in 1993 and 24,500 by 1996. The paper is available free for pick-up at locations throughout Metro Chicago, by mail subscription and in an email PDF edition (since December 2008). Its masthead was designed in 1990 by Chicago graphic artist Gerry Kalvelage of BBDO, and includes the newspaper's motto "Useful Information Faithfully Recorded" (a loose translation from the Hebrew of Ecclesiastes XII:10).

== Awards ==
In the annual Chicago Headline Club-sponsored Peter Lisagor Awards for Exemplary Journalism competition for work done in 2009, 2013, 2015 and 2016, the Jewish Star was a Finalist for Best Editorial Writing. In the Lisagor competition covering 2012, the Jewish Star won awards in its publishing category for Arts Reporting, Political and Government Reporting, and Editorial; and had eight Finalist citations in six entry groups (Design, Political and Government Reporting, Editorial, Sports, Arts, In-Depth Reporting).

In the Lisagor competition covering 2011, the paper won the award for Best Arts Reporting and Criticism; and had two Finalist citations in the Arts Reporting entry group. In the competition covering 2010, it received awards for Best Arts Reporting and Criticism, and Best Newspaper Design; and a total of five Finalist citations in four entry groups (Editorial, Arts, In-Depth Reporting, Design).

== Controversies and Issues ==
=== First Amendment rights and newspaper distribution ===
After World War II, newspapers had increasingly relied on distribution of single copies from news boxes on public streets (a right recognized by the U.S. Supreme Court in 1988 in City of Lakewood v. Plain Dealer Publishing Co.). Nonetheless, the practice was challenged by some municipalities. The Jewish Star began distributing its free newspaper in its own street-corner news boxes (also referred to as news racks, honor boxes or vending machines) in March 1991, the only Chicago Jewish newspaper ever to do so.

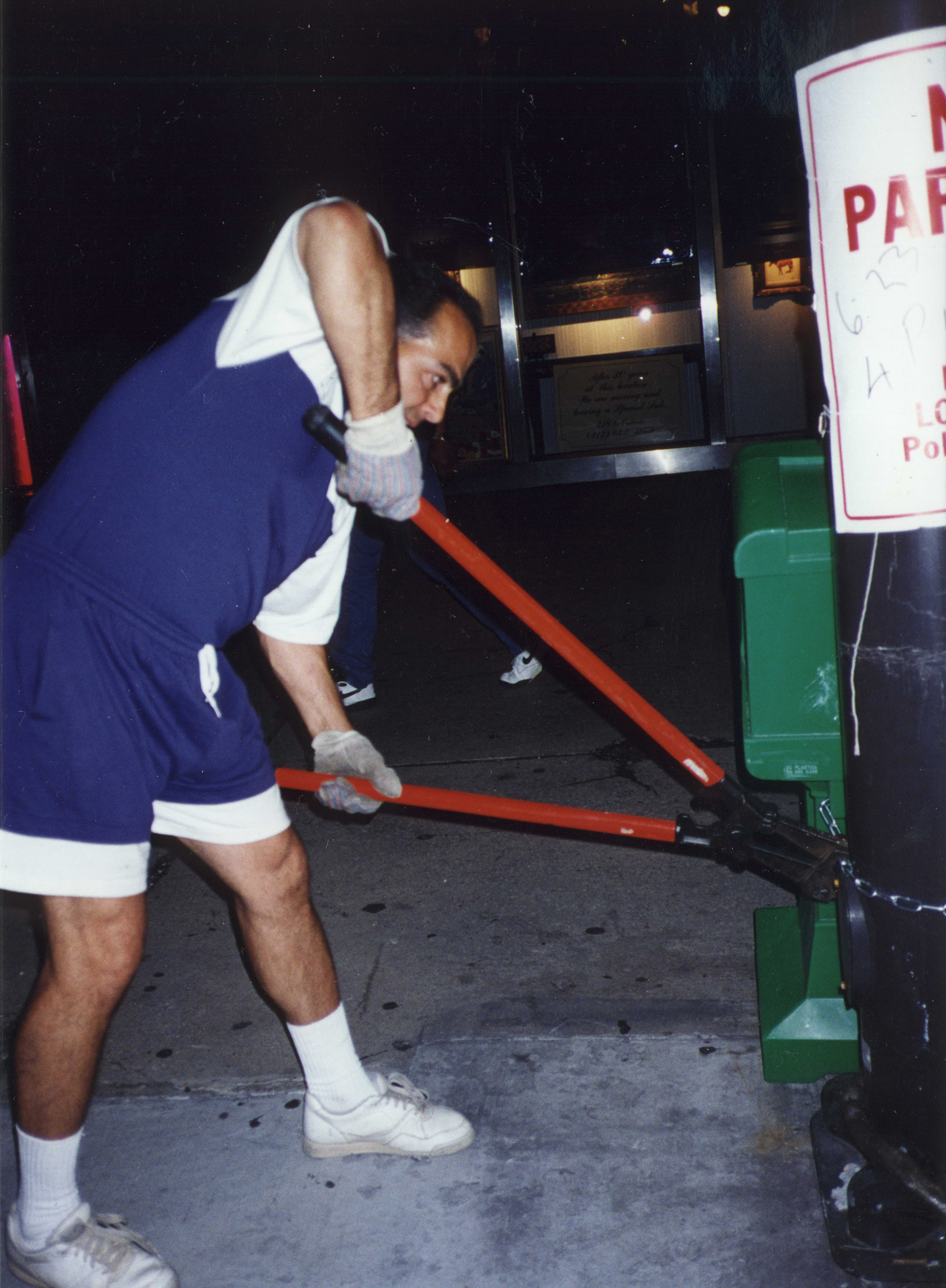
An unidentified City of Chicago Streets and Sanitation worker illegally cuts the cable on a Chicago Jewish Star news box at the southwest corner of Michigan and Adams on the night of June 22, 1994. The City of Chicago had previously denied that any City worker had been authorized to move Jewish Star newsboxes.

In January 1992, the administration of Chicago Mayor Richard M. Daley began a program to have newspaper publishers voluntarily re-align their multiple news boxes along North Michigan Avenue; at the time, Chicago was typical in having no permit or licensing requirements concerning the placement of news boxes. A few months after the Chicago beautification program was launched, the Jewish Star complained to the city about mysterious damage to its news boxes. "If you have any evidence that this damage was caused by an employee of the City of Chicago," the city advised, "the City Department of Law would be happy to review it." The news box "clean up" soon expanded to other downtown Chicago areas, and the Jewish Star continued to encounter unauthorized movement of its news boxes. The Jewish Star maintained a surveillance of its news boxes, and on the night of June 22, 1994, photographed a City of Chicago Streets and Sanitation employee using bolt cutters to slice through the chain on a legally positioned Jewish Star news box at Michigan Avenue and Adams Street, and then moving it.

The Jewish Star enlisted the support of local city aldermen, an Illinois state senator, the Illinois Press Association and the American Civil Liberties Union in protesting what it termed "a blatantly illegal act." The city claimed that "no City employee has removed or destroyed any Chicago Jewish Star boxes or newspapers." Writing on behalf of the Jewish Star, the ACLU responded: "For your information, the Star has a photograph of a City employee, who was driving a Streets and Sanitation truck, in the process of removing the box in question."

In September 1994, a Jewish Star news box on the near north side of Chicago was blown up; a few days later, the Jewish Star and two politicians met with a top city official, and shortly thereafter resolved the dispute. After the refusal of its offer of a cash settlement for damages to Jewish Star news boxes, the city paid the requested amount of $1,600 to the Jewish Star.

In the ensuing years, the city adopted an ordinance restricting news box placement. At that time, the Jewish Star criticized the Daley administration for considering news boxes no more than "visual clutter," and fellow newspaper publishers for failing to fight the city on First Amendment grounds.

=== Journalistic ethics ===
Plagiarism and circulation falsification have long been problems in journalism, continuing during the 1990s. In March 1995, Jewish Star Editor Douglas Wertheimer asserted to the Ethics Committee of the American Jewish Press Association (AJPA) that two of its member publications "are engaging in questionable journalistic practices, and have been doing so for a considerable period of time." The allegations were made against the Chicago Jewish News and The Sentinel, weekly Chicago Jewish newspapers, in a five-page letter with 98 pages of documentation, subsequent additions and an oral presentation by Wertheimer before the Ethics Committee. In August, the AJPA Ethics Committee issued a four-page report upholding the Jewish Star claims. Concerning the Chicago Jewish News, the AJPA stated, "We censure the apparent violations that have taken place to date," noting that "there is substantial credible documented evidence of a pattern of neglect on the part of the Chicago Jewish News of failure to obtain advance permission and/or to properly credit the source of various items used since it began publication." Concerning The Sentinel, the report stated, "There is substantial credible documentation of the use of circulation figures claimed by The Sentinel which are substantially in excess of the publication's official figures." The report characterized Wertheimer's allegations against the two newspapers as "made in good faith." In response, Chicago Jewish News editor and publisher Joseph Aaron accused Wertheimer of "immoral, underhanded, and anti-Jewish actions," claiming the charges "were absurd." Sentinel editor and publisher Jack Fishbein said, "Why don't you just sell your own ads and worry about your own product?"

In June 1995, Wertheimer complained to the Consumer Fraud Bureau of the Illinois Attorney General about what he alleged were The Sentinel's "fraudulent circulation figures." On December 1, 1995, The Sentinel entered into an assurance of voluntary compliance with the State of Illinois over the newspaper's alleged violations of the Illinois Consumer Fraud and Deceptive Business Practices Act, and paid the state $1,000 to "cover investigative costs."

As a result of the Jewish Star complaint, in December 1995 AJPA amended its by-laws "to make clear the various violations we dealt with in the recent Chicago matter."

=== Legislation affecting the Jewish community ===
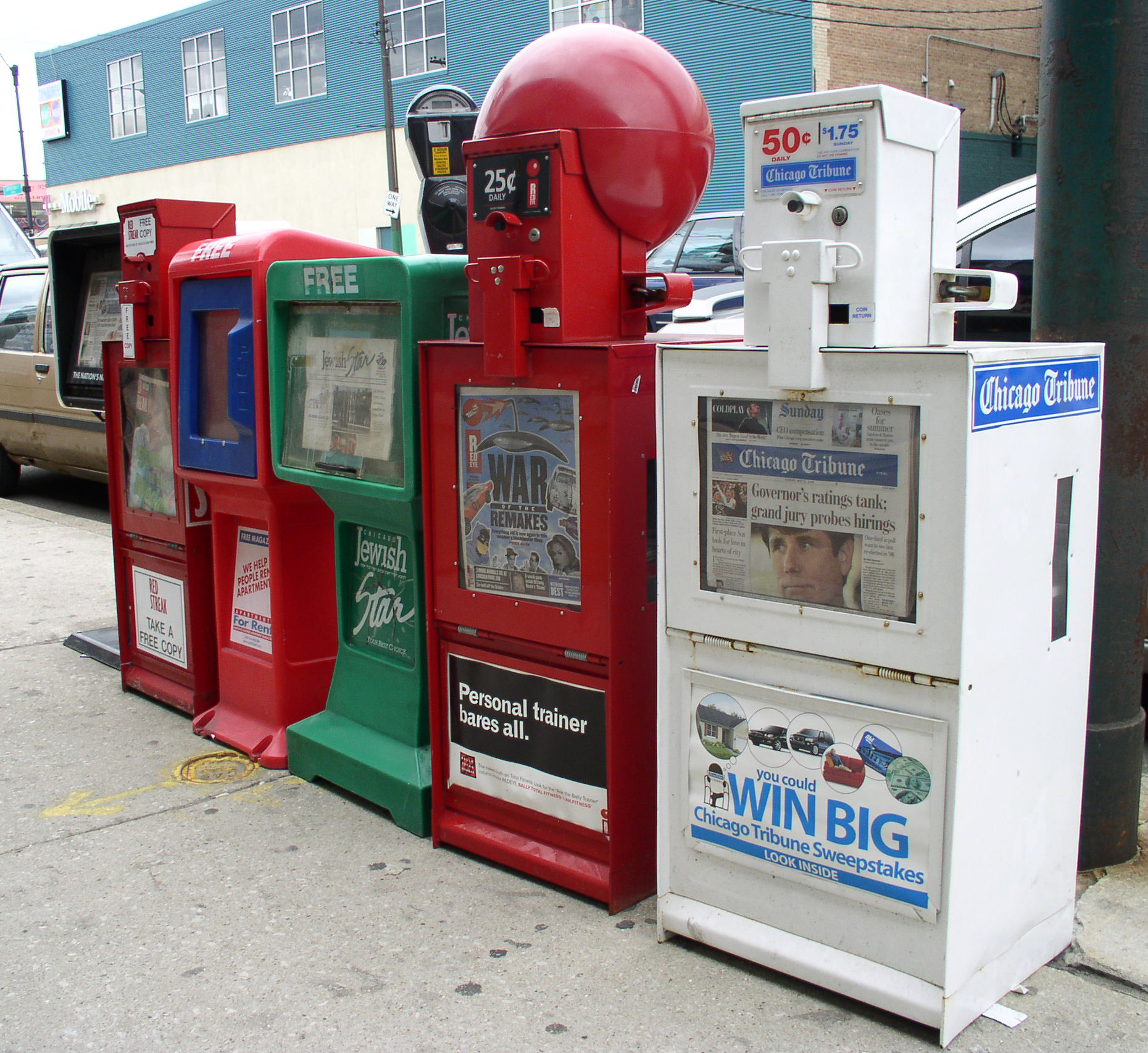
A Chicago Jewish Star news box (in green) in the South Loop, 2005.

Although a common custom among the vast majority of Jews, affixing a mezuzah on a doorpost became an act increasingly likely in Chicago to come in conflict with the rules of condominium associations, as that city typified a country which "has been condo crazy the past few years." In May 2004, two Jewish condo owners at Shoreline Towers Condominium in Chicago protested the association's instruction that all exterior objects, including mezuzot, be removed. Later, other condo associations in Illinois, Florida and Texas were revealed to have adopted a similar restriction. In Chicago, unable to successfully resolve the matter by bringing pressure on the condo associations, litigation followed in 2005.

Detailed reporting on the controversy by the Jewish Star resulted in city and state legislation prohibiting mezuzah banning. After reading the first media coverage of the dispute, by the Jewish Star in July 2005, Chicago Alderman Burton Natarus composed in 10 minutes an ordinance amending Chicago's Municipal Code to legally prohibit condo associations from banning mezuzah placement on exterior unit doorposts. Four months later, the ordinance was adopted. Meanwhile, though there were signs that the condo boards would resolve the legal dispute, Illinois State Senator Ira Silverstein, having read the same Jewish Star report as Natarus, was likewise appalled and introduced a bill in the Illinois Senate to prevent such rules by condo boards. The law came into effect in January 2007.

Notwithstanding this legislation, lawsuits continued involving Shoreline Towers Condominium Association. At one point, the Jewish Star successfully fended off an attempt to subpoena its records; at another, an Illinois law barring intimidating lawsuits was applied for the first time; and in yet another instance, a Federal Appeals Court in Chicago overruled an earlier decision, and determined that the Fair Housing Act can prohibit discrimination that occurs after homeowners occupy a dwelling.

=== Other controversies ===
Among other controversial issues appearing in the Jewish Star are: coverage of the expulsion of five students at Chicago's Ida Crown Jewish Academy; the Chicago Jewish Federation's pursuit of the estate of Sol Goldstein for an unpaid pledge; an Edgar Degas painting looted by the Nazis housed at the Art Institute of Chicago; reader outrage when the Jewish Star published a paid ad inviting Jews to a feast on Yom Kippur; Jewish surgeon Raymond Pollak's whistleblower lawsuit against prominent Chicago-area hospitals; coverage of the controversy surrounding Jewel-Osco food stores' aggressive move into the kosher food business; the city of Chicago's alleged sponsorship of anti-Israel activity during Arab Heritage Month and Chicago Arabesque; and an exhibit at the Spertus Institute for Jewish Learning and Leadership which compared the plight of Palestinians and Jews.

== Milestones ==
Year	Event	Comments
1990	Formation	Star Media Group Inc. founded.
1991	Debut	First issue of Chicago Jewish Star appears on February 22, 1991.
1991	Distribution	First Chicago Jewish newspaper to be distributed from street corner news boxes.
1991	Madrid Conference of 1991	Helen Davis files reports by fax from Madrid to the Jewish Star on the Mideast peace conference there which are printed in the next day's paper.
1994	Illegal removal of news boxes	Following a two-year dispute with the City of Chicago about its news boxes being illegally moved by the city, the dispute is resolved and the city pays $1,600 for damages to Jewish Star news boxes.
1998	Desktop publishing	An entire issue of the Jewish Star is completely computer-paginated, using QuarkXPress software.
2005	Mezuzah law	Articles in the Jewish Star on Chicago condominiums which are banning residents from affixing exterior mezuzahs on their door posts directly lead to laws being passed for Chicago (2005), Illinois (2006) and Florida (2008), and one in Texas (2011) adopted with knowledge of the Illinois law.
2013	Awards	The Jewish Star sets two records for Chicago Jewish newspapers with 3 awards, and 8 Finalist citations, in a single year's competition for the Peter Lisagor Awards for Exemplary Journalism, sponsored by the Chicago Headline Club.

== In popular culture ==
A December 4, 1992 issue of the Jewish Star makes four cameo appearances in John Maloof and Charlie Siskel's 2013 documentary Finding Vivian Maier, about the noted Chicago street photographer. Maier saved piles of newspapers, clipping out items of interest which mainly pertained to crime. Why she saved this issue of the Jewish Star remains unknown.
