= Yechiam Weitz =

Israeli professor and historian (born 1951)

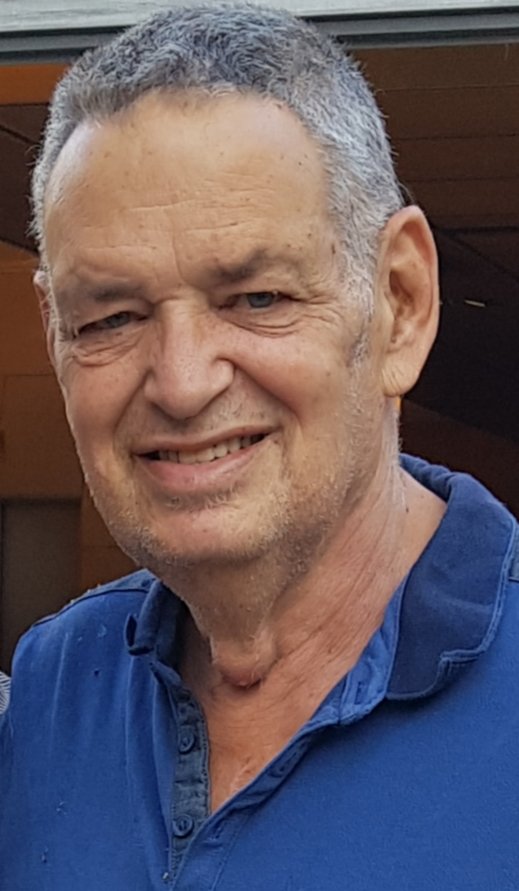
Prof. Yechiam Weitz

Yechiam Weitz (Hebrew: יחיעם ויץ; born 1951) is an Israeli professor and historian.

== Biography ==
Yechiam Weitz is the grandson of Yosef Weitz, director of the Land and Afforestation Department of the Jewish National Fund, whose son Yechiam was killed in a Palmach operation in 1946.

Weitz obtained his B.A. in history and philosophy in 1977, and his M.A. in history in 1982, from the Hebrew University of Jerusalem. He obtained his PhD in 1988, also from the Hebrew University of Jerusalem, on the topic of "The Attitude of Mapai Towards the Destruction of European Jewry 1939-1945," supervised by Yisrael Gutman.

== Academic career ==
Weitz teaches at the Department of Land of Israel Studies at the University of Haifa. He is the editor of Between Vision and Revision: One Hundred Years of Zionist Historiography (1994) and author of a book about Rudolf Kastner, Ha-Ish she-Nirtsah Paamayim ("The Man who was Murdered Twice")

== Published works ==
- From Fighting Underground to Political Party Ben-Gurion Research Center, Ben-Gurion University of the Negev
- "The Man who was Murdered Twice" Yad Vashem, 2011
- The Holocaust on Trial: The Impact of the Kasztner and Eichmann Trials on Israeli Society, Israel Studies, Volume 1, Number 2, Fall 1996, pp. 1–26
- The Herut Movement and the Kasztner Trial, Holocaust and Genocide Studies, Oxford University Press
