= The Jewish Star (Alberta) =

Canadian Jewish newspaper

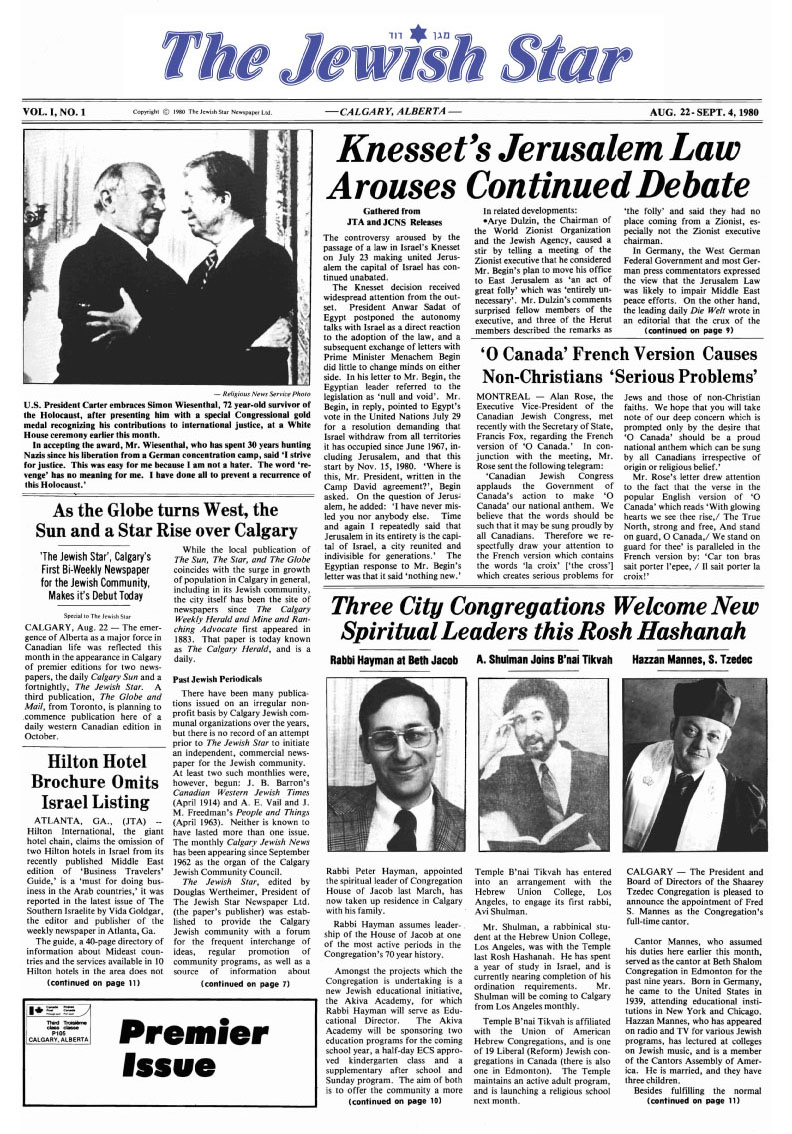
- Front page of the first issue of The Jewish Star (Calgary Edition)
- Type: Free fortnightly newspaper
- Format: Tabloid
- Publisher: The Jewish Star Newspaper, Inc.
- Editor: Douglas Wertheimer; Gila Wertheimer
- Founded: August 22, 1980
- Ceased publication: June 1, 1990
- Headquarters: Calgary, Alberta; Canada
- Price: Free

The Jewish Star was a newspaper which appeared in two editions, both produced in Calgary, Alberta, from 1980 to 1990. The fortnightly Calgary edition (ISSN 0228-2283) of The Jewish Star was the first independent Jewish newspaper published in that city; the monthly Edmonton edition (ISSN 0228-6017) of The Jewish Star was the first independent Jewish newspaper published for the provincial capital. Both editions were tabloid-sized newspapers (ranging from 8 to 28 pages per issue) mailed on a controlled circulation basis to virtually all Jewish households in each city.

== History ==
The Jewish Star was founded by Douglas Wertheimer, who served as editor and president of The Jewish Star Newspaper, Ltd., and Gila Wertheimer, associate editor, with start-up funding from family members, supporters and bank loans. The founding of the newspaper coincided with an explosion of economic growth in Alberta related to the oil industry. Calgary, known since 1945 as one of Canada's fastest-growing cities, had undergone a population increase of 47 percent from 1971 to 1981. Meanwhile, the Calgary Jewish community had increased by 50 percent from 1975-79 to about 6,000 Jews. The two editions of the independent Jewish Star appeared at a time when the organized Jewish communities across Canada were "moving to take over Jewish weeklies." Moreover, the state of Jewish journalism in Canada left "a great deal to be desired," according to historian Stuart E. Rosenberg.

Commenting on the start-up of the Calgary edition of The Jewish Star, the Calgary Herald noted that the paper had "avoided some of the more obvious first-issue pitfalls by using good layout, attractive printing free of typographical errors, professional writing by three international Jewish wire services and plenty of local content... there was [also] a heavy advertising content." After the launch of the Calgary edition (published from August 22, 1980 through June 1, 1990), the Jewish Community Council in Edmonton invited the publishers to produce a separate Edmonton Edition. It ran as a monthly from December 1980 through June 1990, utilizing some of the same content. While also independent, it received a guaranteed annual purchase of subscriptions (an arrangement voluntarily terminated by The Jewish Star in 1987).

During the 1980s, the company was the sole independent publisher in Canada of more than one Jewish newspaper. From around 1984, it began taking on typesetting jobs, including typesetting and photographic services for William D. Peacock's Native Albertan, the Italian-language newspaper Lo Stivale, and D. Bercuson and D. Wertheimer's 241-page book, A Trust Betrayed (Doubleday, 1981). In the late 1980s, it made an unsuccessful attempt to purchase the Jewish Western Bulletin of Vancouver.

== Editorial, advertising, circulation ==
For the Calgary Edition, local news, editorial and advertising content were generated mainly by full-time Jewish Star staff, with other material for that edition coming from freelance writers and syndicated news services. For the Edmonton Edition, over the years a freelance writer provided local news coverage, and for most of the decade advertising was handled by the Dave Moser Agencies in that city. In 1988, controlled circulation for the Calgary edition averaged 1,900 copies, for the Edmonton edition 1,500. The editorial position of the newspapers was characterized as displaying "a small 'l' liberal stance," with "no religious axe to grind."

== Awards and recognition ==
In A Century of the Canadian Jewish Press: 1880s-1980s, author Lewis Levendel wrote of The Jewish Star editions, "The most exciting event in Canadian Jewish journalism in the 1980s has been the brave attempt by an Alberta couple to launch an independent newspaper... The Stars – by far the most attractive of Canadian Jewish papers – have been showered with praise for their appearance, editorials and news coverage... Outside Alberta, Jewish journalists and communal officials familiar with the Star expressed admiration for the paper".

During the 1980s, The Jewish Star (Calgary Edition) won more journalistic awards than any other Jewish publication in Canada. The editors won first place Rockower Awards of the American Jewish Press Association in 1982 (editorial writing) and 1984 (tied, editorial), an honorable mention in 1985 (design), and a second place award in 1987 (editorial).

From its launching, The Jewish Star was one of only two Canadian Jewish publications to produce its own book reviews, rather than reprint syndicated columns. Gila Wertheimer, among the most prolific literary critics in the Jewish media (having reviewed 206 books in The Jewish Star), also had pieces published in Judaica Book News (New York) and Canadian Jewish newspapers.

== Controversies and issues ==
=== Calgary ===
The Calgary Jewish Community Council had published an in-house non-commercial newspaper, the Calgary Jewish News, since 1962 (Douglas Wertheimer served as editor from 1979–80). For several years after the founding of the Calgary Jewish Star, tension existed between the organized community and the independent newspaper, reflected in frank reporting on the community. Early editorials were critical of the organized community for allowing its Jewish community center to be opened on Shabbat and for its treatment of visiting Israeli officials, and provided a forum for others who sought change. Community officials characterized The Star as "a divisive force". The newspaper also faulted the Canadian Jewish establishment for its dismissive attitude towards Western Canadian Jews and in particular for its stance on the rescue of Ethiopian Jews.

=== Edmonton ===
In general the Edmonton Edition of The Star was less controversial than its Calgary counterpart, although inevitably material upset community officials (including an article by an Israeli shaliach about the end of the Edmonton Jewish community).

=== Calgary and Edmonton ===
At the end of 1982, a high school teacher in a small town between Calgary and Edmonton was fired for devoting classroom time to teaching the myth of the Jewish world-conspiracy. The case of Jim Keegstra of Eckville soon attracted national attention. One of the results was the testing, in court, of the hate promotion section of the Criminal Code of Canada. Beginning in April 1983 and for years afterwards, The Jewish Star covered the story, which included criticism of the handling of the case by the provincial government of Peter Lougheed, the Canadian Jewish Congress, and the Calgary Herald. Utilizing that knowledge, research materials, and interviews, D. Wertheimer collaborated with University of Calgary historian David J. Bercuson on a book-length study, A Trust Betrayed: The Keegstra Affair (published by Doubleday in Canada and the US, 1985, ISBN 0-385-25003-7; Bantam Seal paperback, 1987, ISBN 0-7704-2155-5). The book was called "a first rate account" in a Toronto Star review.

Even before the Keegstra controversy forced the Calgary and Edmonton Jewish communities to coordinate activities, The Star endorsed a unifying Jewish council for the province, which was eventually created.

== Newspapers' closing ==
Both editions of The Jewish Star published their final issues in June 1990. In the following month the Wertheimers left Canada and started the independent Chicago Jewish Star, that city's first new Jewish newspaper published solely for that area in nearly 75 years.

== Milestones ==
Year	Event	Comments
1980	Debut	The Jewish Star, the first independent Jewish newspaper published in Calgary, appears on August 22, 1980.
1980	Expansion	In December 1980, a monthly Edmonton edition of The Jewish Star (edited from Calgary), is launched at the request of the Edmonton Jewish Community Council, the first independent Jewish newspaper published for Edmonton.
1981	Western Canada	An editorial explaining the alienation felt by Western Canadian Jews towards the Eastern Jewish establishment wins an award from the American Jewish Press Association.
1983	Keegstra Affair	Beginning with its April 29 issue, the newspaper extensively covers the Keegstra Affair in its Calgary and Edmonton editions; in 1985, Jewish Star editor Douglas Wertheimer and David J. Bercuson co-author A Trust Betrayed: The Keegstra Affair.
1983	Phototypesetting	The Jewish Star, produced in-house on a Compuwriter IV-B phototypesetter almost from the first issue, for the December 16, 1983 issue begins using the microCOMPOSER interface by Cybertext Corp. in California for a TRS-80 Model III computer as the system front-end.
1987	Awards	The Jewish Star wins its fourth journalism award from the American Jewish Press Association, more than any Canadian Jewish publication during the 1980s.
1987	Independence	The Edmonton Jewish Star becomes financially independent of the Edmonton Jewish Community Council in August. The newspaper had initially agreed to publish an Edmonton edition, with all subscriptions paid for by the EJCC, an arrangement it voluntarily terminated.
1988	Advertising	The largest issues of the Edmonton Jewish Star (September 1987, 24 pages) and Calgary Jewish Star (September 9, 1988, 28 pages) are published.

== See also ==
- Shaula Fraenkel, compiler, The Jewish Star (Calgary edition) index, 1980-1986, Calgary: The Jewish Star Newspaper Ltd., 1990.
- Eliezer Segal, Why Didn't I Learn This in Hebrew School?, Northvale, NJ: Jason Aronson Inc., 1999. Contains articles by Segal originally appearing in The Jewish Star.
- Eliezer Segal, Holidays, History, and Halakhah, Northvale, NJ: Jason Aronson Inc., 2000. Contains articles by Segal originally appearing in The Jewish Star.
