= Ronald W. Zweig =

Australian-Israeli historian (born 1949)

- רונלד צווייג
- Born: 1949 (age 76–77)
- Occupation: Historian

Ronald W. Zweig (Hebrew: רונלד צווייג) is an Australian-Israeli historian specializing in Hebrew and Judaic studies, with particular reference to the British Mandate in Palestine. He is currently the Marilyn and Henry Taub Professor of Israel Studies at New York University (NYU).

Zweig is the author of a number of books on Jewish and Israel studies, including The Gold Train: The Destruction of the Jews and the Looting of Hungary (2002), the story of a train run by the Nazis, the so-called "Hungarian Gold Train", that left Budapest, Hungary during the Second World War, heading for a Nazi-controlled area in the Alps. The train was carrying gold, diamonds, and wedding rings that the Nazis had stolen from the Hungarian Jewish community. It was intercepted by the American military before it could reach its destination, and the fate of its contents has been the subject of speculation ever since. Zweig acted as a consultant to the U.S. Department of Justice on a related lawsuit—Rosner, et al. v. United States of America—which alleged U.S. military malfeasance.

== Career ==
Zweig studied at the University of Sydney, then moved to England. After graduating with a Ph.D. in modern history from the University of Cambridge, he became a junior fellow at the University of Oxford's Center for Hebrew Studies, 1977–1978. He was a visiting fellow at the Tauber Institute, Brandeis University, in 1982. He then joined the staff of Hebrew University of Jerusalem, and in 1983 transferred to the Department of Jewish History at Tel Aviv University, serving as Chair from 2003–2004. From 1983 to 2000 he edited the Journal of Israeli History. He was a visiting archives fellow at Churchill College, Cambridge, in 1994; a visiting senior scholar at the U.S. Holocaust Memorial Museum in 1999; and held a research fellowship at Yad Vashem in 2000.

In 2004, he became the director of the Taub Center for Israel Studies at NYU. He is also a member of the Historical Advisory Panel to the National Archives in Washington.

== Books by Zweig ==
- The Political Uses of Military Intelligence: Evaluating the threat of a Jewish revolt against Britain during the Second World War, Cambridge University Press, January 1, 1985.
- Britain and Palestine during the Second World War (Royal Historical Society Studies in History), Royal Historical Society, February 27, 1986. ISBN 0-86193-200-5
- David Ben Gurion: Politics and Leadership in Israel (Ed.), Frank Cass, October 1, 1991. ISBN 0-7146-3423-9
- German Reparations and the Jewish World: a History of the Claims Conference, Frank Cass, May 1, 2001. ISBN 0-7146-5152-4
- The Gold Train: The Destruction of the Jews and the Looting of Hungary, William Morrow, September 17, 2002. ISBN 0-06-620956-0
