= American Jewish Press Association =

Journalism organization

- Formation: 1944
- Founder: Gabriel Cohen
- President: Ellen Futterman
- Website: ajpa.org

The American Jewish Press Association (AJPA) is an organization of Jewish newspapers, magazines, journalists, and affiliated organizations in North America. Founded in 1944 by Gabriel Cohen as the Anglo-Jewish Publishers Association, AJPA awards the Rockower Awards, considered the "Jewish Pulitzers."

== History ==
The American Jewish Press Association (AJPA) was founded on May 2, 1944, as the Anglo-Jewish Publishers Association. During its 2-day organizational meeting in Indianapolis, initiated by Gabriel Cohen of the Indianapolis Jewish Post, the AJPA also adopted resolutions condemning the White Paper of 1939 ban on Jewish immigration to Mandatory Palestine, the mistreatment of Jews in the Polish armed forces, and pledging its support to the American war effort. Before the AJPA, previous attempts to join Jewish journalists as a group had failed. The group's original membership included only English-language Jewish weekly newspapers.

In 1980, AJPA's membership included 75 English-language publications in the United States and Canada. As of 2024, AJPA had 120 member organizations.

== Rockower Awards ==
AJPA established the Simon Rockower Memorial Writing Competition for member publications in 1980. The competition was funded by a grant from Rockower Brothers, Inc., in honor of the 100th anniversary of the birth of founder Simon Rockower. Norman Lamm of Yeshiva University was the competition's original president, with David Mirsky of Yeshiva University as the inaugural chair. The competition began in 1981 with six categories, including news writing, editorial writing, feature writing, cultural and arts writing, special series, page one make-up, and graphics.

The awards, considered the "Jewish Pulitzers," are presented at a banquet in November each year.

=== List of categories ===
The first competition had six categories, growing to 22 by 2017. In 2024, there were 32 award categories, with three additional wild card categories for reporting on the Gaza war.

Until 2020 the entries for most categories were divided by circulation. Since 2021 the divisions are Weekly and Biweekly Newspapers, Monthly Newspapers and Magazines and Web-based Outlets.

Category	Description	Division A	Division B	Division C
1	The Louis Rapoport Award for Excellence in Commentary	Weekly and Biweekly Newspapers	Monthly Newspapers and Magazines	Web-based Outlets; Digital Only, Website Only and Wire Services
2	Award for Excellence in Single Commentary	Weekly and Biweekly Newspapers	Monthly Newspapers and Magazines	Web-based Outlets; Digital Only, Website Only and Wire Services
3	Award for Excellence in Personal Essay	Weekly and Biweekly Newspapers	Monthly Newspapers and Magazines	Web-based Outlets; Digital Only, Website Only and Wire Services
4	Award for Excellence in Editorial Writing	All		
5	The Boris Smolar Award for Excellence in Enterprise or Investigative Reporting	Weekly and Biweekly Newspapers	Monthly Newspapers and Magazines	Web-based Outlets; Digital Only, Website Only and Wire Services
6	Award for Excellence in News Reporting	Weekly and Biweekly Newspapers	Monthly Newspapers and Magazines	Web-based Outlets; Digital Only, Website Only and Wire Services
7	Award for Excellence in Writing about Social Justice and Humanitarian Work	Weekly and Biweekly Newspapers	Monthly Newspapers and Magazines	Web-based Outlets; Digital Only, Website Only and Wire Services
8	Award for Excellence in Feature Writing	Weekly and Biweekly Newspapers	Monthly Newspapers and Magazines	Web-based Outlets; Digital Only, Website Only and Wire Services
9	Award for Excellence in Arts News and Features – Reporting (movie, theater, television, books, music, etc.)	Weekly and Biweekly Newspapers	Monthly Newspapers and Magazines	Web-based Outlets; Digital Only, Website Only and Wire Services
10	Award for Excellence in Arts – Review/Criticism (movie, theater, television, books, music, etc.)	Weekly and Biweekly Newspapers	Monthly Newspapers and Magazines	Web-based Outlets; Digital Only, Website Only and Wire Services
11	Award for Excellence in Personality Profiles	Weekly and Biweekly Newspapers	Monthly Newspapers and Magazines	Web-based Outlets; Digital Only, Website Only and Wire Services
12	Award for Excellence in Special Sections or Supplements	All		
13	Award for Excellence in Writing about Health Care	Weekly and Biweekly Newspapers	Monthly Newspapers and Magazines	Web-based Outlets; Digital Only, Website Only and Wire Services
14	Award for Journalistic Excellence in Covering Zionism, Aliyah and Israel	Weekly and Biweekly Newspapers	Monthly Newspapers and Magazines	Web-based Outlets; Digital Only, Website Only and Wire Services
15	Award for Excellence in Writing about Women	Weekly and Biweekly Newspapers	Monthly Newspapers and Magazines	Web-based Outlets; Digital Only, Website Only and Wire Services
16	Award of Excellence in Writing about Jewish Heritage and Jewish Peoplehood in Europe	Weekly and Biweekly Newspapers	Monthly Newspapers and Magazines	Web-based Outlets; Digital Only, Website Only and Wire Services
17	Award for Journalistic Excellence in North American Jewish History	Weekly and Biweekly Newspapers	Monthly Newspapers and Magazines	Web-based Outlets; Digital Only, Website Only and Wire Services
18	Award for Excellence in Photography	All		
19	Award for Excellence in Interfaith Relations Reporting	All		
20	Award for Excellence in Writing about Food and Wine	Weekly and Biweekly Newspapers	Monthly Newspapers and Magazines	Web-based Outlets; Digital Only, Website Only and Wire Services
21	Award for Excellence in Writing about Sports	Weekly and Biweekly Newspapers	Monthly Newspapers and Magazines	Web-based Outlets; Digital Only, Website Only and Wire Services
22	Award for Excellence in Writing about Seniors	Weekly and Biweekly Newspapers	Monthly Newspapers and Magazines	Web-based Outlets; Digital Only, Website Only and Wire Services
23	Award for Excellence in Business Reporting – Trends	All		
24	Award for Excellence in News Obituaries	Weekly and Biweekly Newspapers	Monthly Newspapers and Magazines	Web-based Outlets; Digital Only, Website Only and Wire Services
25	Award for Excellence in Writing about Politics/Government	Weekly and Biweekly Newspapers	Monthly Newspapers and Magazines	Web-based Outlets; Digital Only, Website Only and Wire Services
26	Award for Excellence in Education Reporting	Weekly and Biweekly Newspapers	Monthly Newspapers and Magazines	Web-based Outlets; Digital Only, Website Only and Wire Services
27	Award for Excellence in Writing about Antisemitism	Weekly and Biweekly Newspapers	Monthly Newspapers and Magazines	Web-based Outlets; Digital Only, Website Only and Wire Services
28	Award for Excellence in Writing about Jewish Thought and Life	Weekly and Biweekly Newspapers	Monthly Newspapers and Magazines	Web-based Outlets; Digital Only, Website Only and Wire Services
29	Award for Excellence in Writing about Young Families/People	Weekly and Biweekly Newspapers	Monthly Newspapers and Magazines	Web-based Outlets; Digital Only, Website Only and Wire Services
30	Award for Excellence in Podcasting	All		
31	Award for Excellence in General Newsletters	All		
32	Award for Outstanding Accomplishments - Best Freelancer	All		
