= Bust of Lucian Blaga =

Monument in Estoril, Portugal

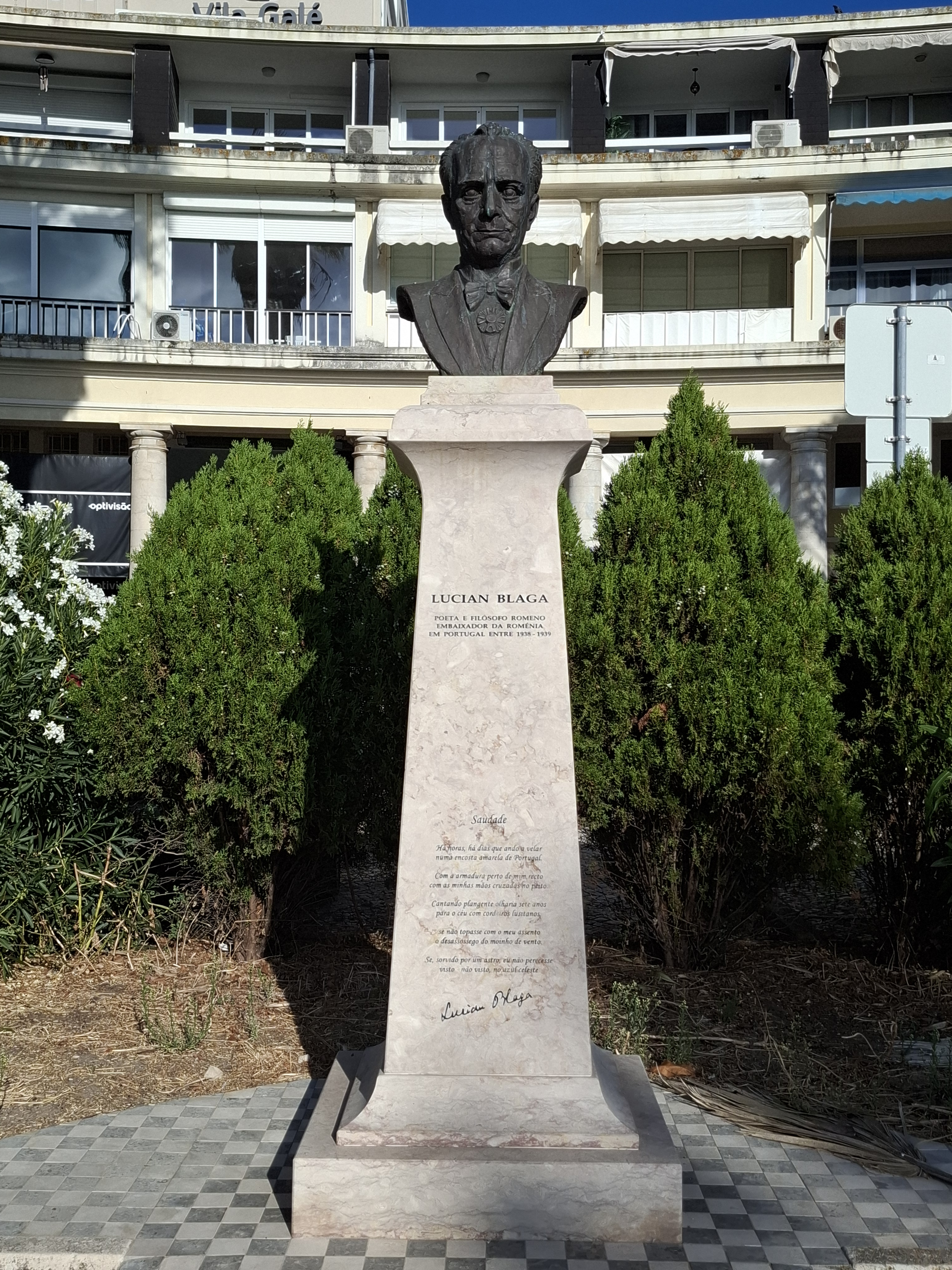
- The monument in 2025.
- Interactive map of Bust of Lucian Blaga
- Location: Clotilde Avenue, Estoril, Lisbon District, Portugal
- Coordinates: 38°42′14.57″N 09°23′50.81″W
- Designer: Aurel Gheorghe Ardelean
- Type: Bust
- Height: 3 m (9.8 ft)
- Opening date: 2 June 2014
- Dedicated to: Lucian Blaga

The bust of Lucian Blaga (Romanian pronunciation: [lu.tʃiˈan ˈbla.ɡa]; Portuguese: busto de Lucian Blaga; Romanian: bustul lui Lucian Blaga) is a monument in the city of Estoril, within the Lisbon District in Portugal. It is placed on the corner of Clotilde Avenue and Arcadas do Parque Street, in front of the Estroil Garden. It commemorates Lucian Blaga, a 20th-century philosopher, poet, playwright, novelist, and politician, who was the plenipotentiary minister of Romania to Portugal from 1938 to 1939. The monument takes a form of a broze bust sculpture placed on top of a white stone pedestal, measuring 3 meters in total. It was designed by Aurel Gheorghe Ardelean and unveiled on 2 June 2014.

== History ==
The monument was proposed by Vasile Popovici, the ambassador of Romania to Portugal from 2006 to 2011. The sculpture was designed by Aurel Gheorghe Ardelean, and was unveiled in Estroil on 2 June 2014, by Titus Corlățean, the Minister of Foreign Affairs. The monument was dedicated to Lucian Blaga, a 20th-century philosopher, poet, playwright, novelist, and politician, who was the plenipotentiary minister of Romania to Portugal from 1938 to 1939. He resided in Estroil, in the nearby Hotel Palácio, for a month in 1938.

On 28 June 2016, the sculpture titled Three Polish Emissaries by Karol Badyna was also unveiled next to the bust of Blaga. It was dedicated dedicated to three couriers of the Polish government-in-exile during the Second World War, Jan Karski, Jerzy Lerski, and Jan Nowak-Jeziorański.

== Description ==
The monument consists of a bronze bust sculpture of Lucian Blaga, placed on top of a white stone pedestal. In total, the monument measures 3 m (9.84 ft). It is placed at the corner of Clotilde Avenue and Arcadas do Parque Street, in front of the Estoril Garden, and near the Hotel Palácio, which housed Blaga for a month in 1938. The pedestal features features the following Portuguese inscription:

Portuguese inscription

Lucian Blaga
Poeta e filósofo Romeno
Embaixador da Roménia
em Portugal entre 1938–1939

Translation:
English translation

Lucian Blaga
Romanian poet and philosopher
The ambassador of Romania to
Portugal from 1938 to 1939

Below, it also bears a quote from Blaga's poem Saudade in Portuguese, which reads:

Portuguese inscription

Saudade
Há horas, há dias que ando a velar numa encosta amarela de Portugal.
Com a armadura perto de mim, recto com as minhas mãos cruzadas no peito.
Cantando plangente olharia sete anos para o céu com cordeiros lusitanos,
se não topasse com o meu assento o desassossego do moinho de vento.
Se, sorvido por um astro, eu não perecesse visto não visto, no azul celeste
Lucian Blaga

Translation:
English translation

Saudade
For hours, for days, I have been keeping watch on a yellow slope in Portugal.
With my armour close to me, with my hands crossed on my chest.
Singing plaintively, I would gaze for seven years at the sky with Lusitanian lambs,
if I didn't bump into the windmill's restlessness from my seat.
If, swallowed by a star, I did not perish seen unseen, in the celestial blue.
Lucian Blaga

== Gallery ==
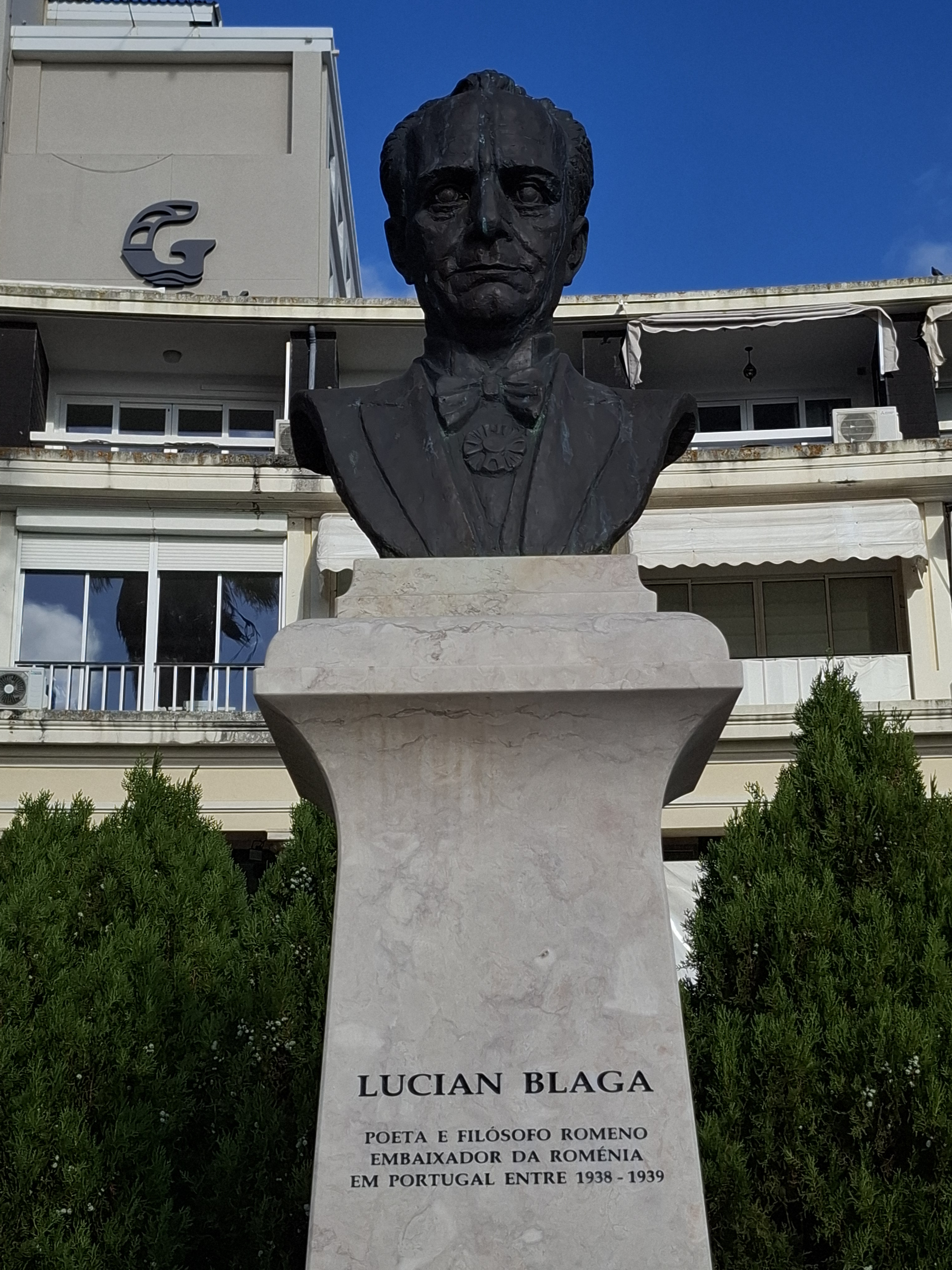
The bust of Lucian Blaga.

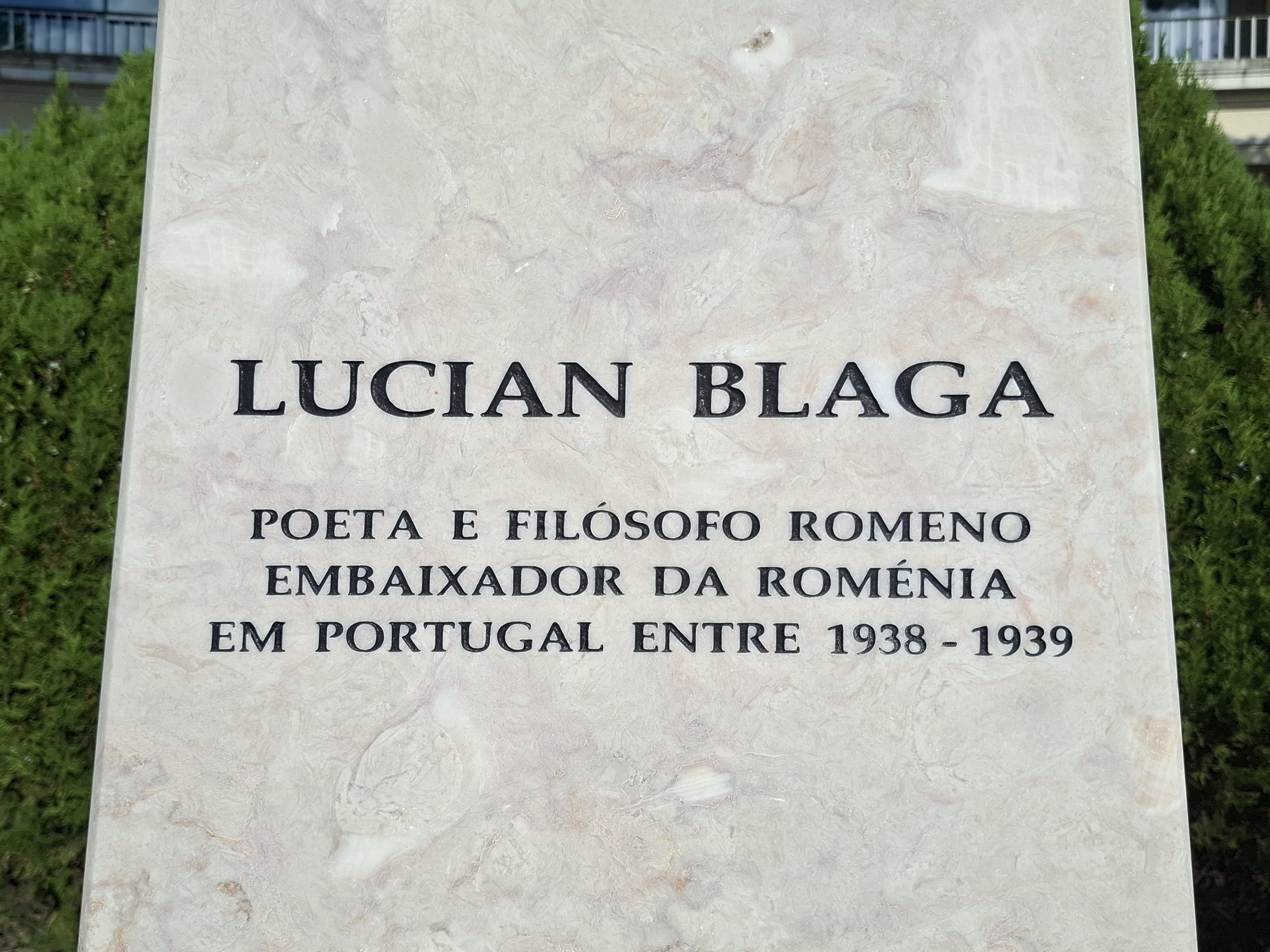
The inscription under the bust.

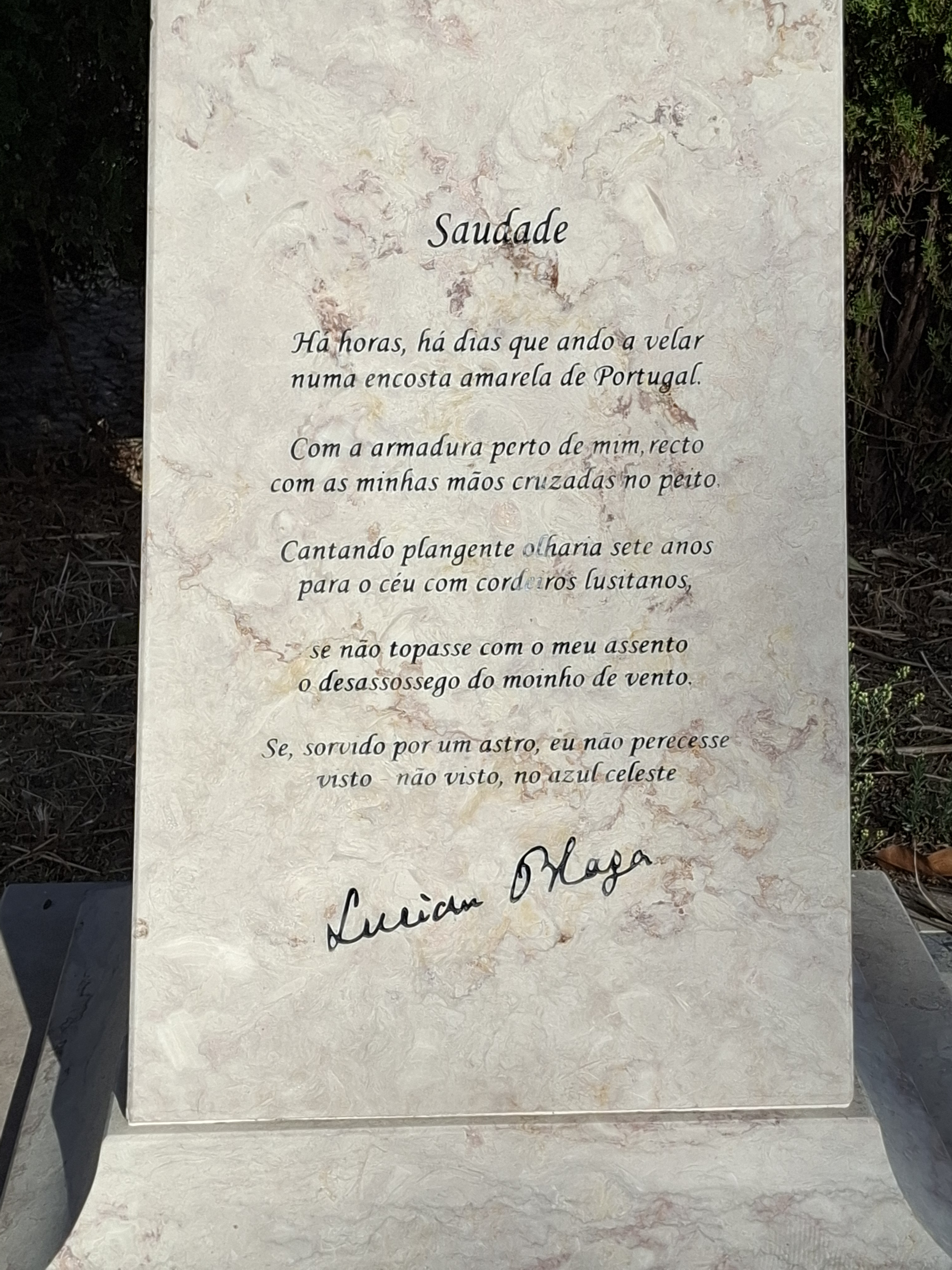
The inscription with Blaga's poem Saudade.
