= Three Polish Emissaries =

Monument in Estoril, Portugal

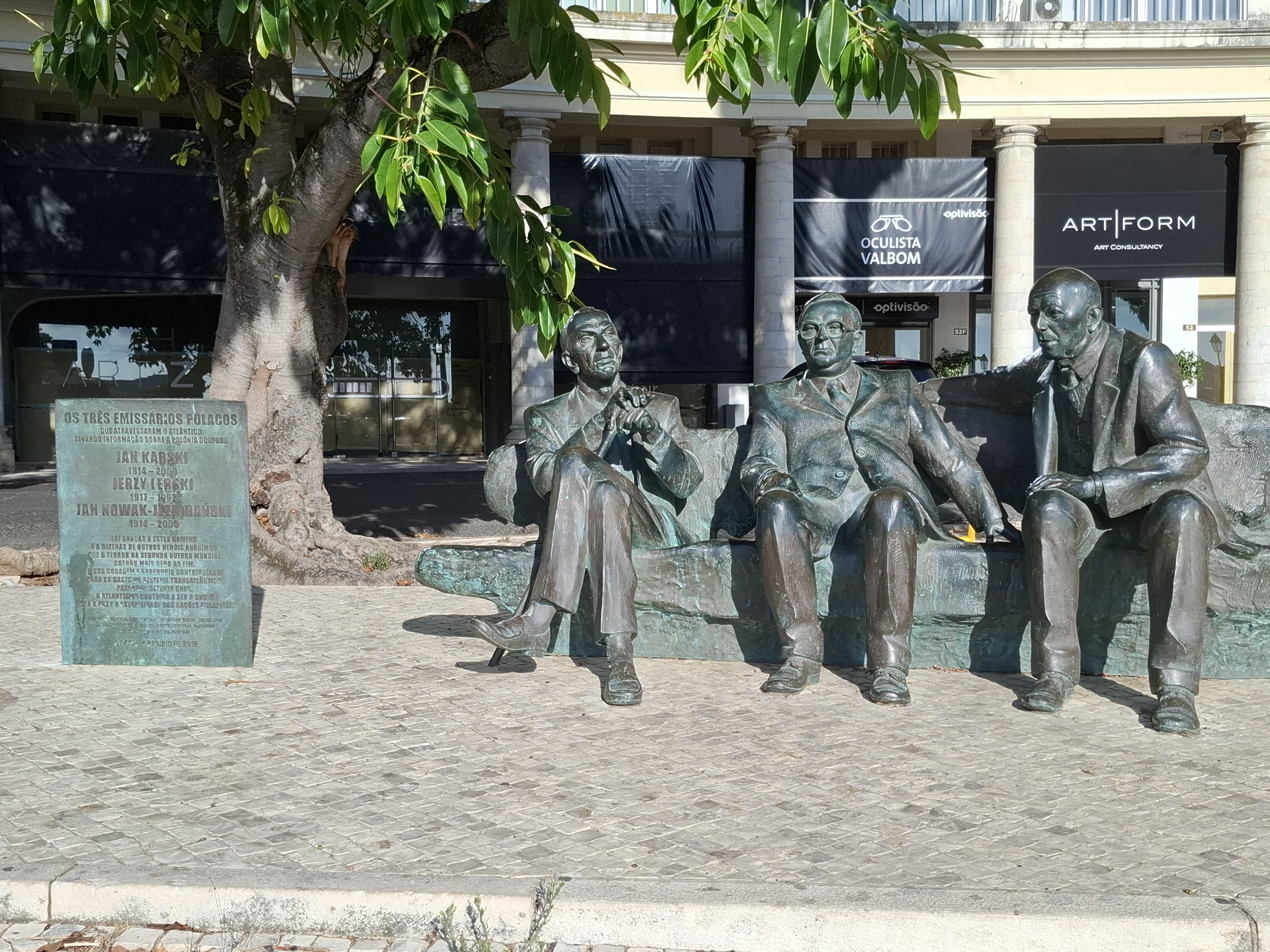
- The monument in 2025.
- Interactive map of Three Polish Emissaries
- Location: Clotilde Avenue, Estoril, Portugal
- Coordinates: 38.704141°N 9.397430°W
- Designer: Karol Badyna
- Type: Statue, bench monument
- Material: Bronze
- Width: 1.35 m (4 ft 5 in)
- Height: 0.9 m (2 ft 11 in)
- Opening date: 28 June 2016
- Dedicated to: Jan Karski; Jerzy Lerski; Jan Nowak-Jeziorański

The Three Polish Emissaries (Portuguese: Três emissários polacos; Polish: Trzech polskich emisariuszy) is a monument in Estoril, Portugal, at the corner of Clotilde Avenue and Arcadas do Parque Street, in front of the Estoril Garden. The bronze statue is dedicated to three couriers of the Polish government-in-exile during the Second World War, Jan Karski, Jerzy Lerski, and Jan Nowak-Jeziorański. It was designed by Karol Badyna and unveiled on 28 June 2016.

== History ==
The monument was financed by Poland-born businessperson André Jordan, and placed on Clotilde Avenue, near the Hotel Palácio, which he owned. During the Second World War, the building used to be a popular meeting spot among spies, as well as housing numerous members of various European royal houses displaced due to the conflict. The monument was designed by Karol Badyna, the sculptor responsible for several bench monuments dedicated to Jan Karski in Poland, United States, and Israel. The monument was created in cooperation with the embassy of Poland in Lisbon and the municipal council of Cascais. The statue was dedicated to three couriers of the Polish government-in-exile during the Second World War, Jan Karski, Jerzy Lerski, and Jan Nowak-Jeziorański. It was unveiled on 28 June 2016 in Estoril.

The monument, the same as previous works by Badyna, was criticised by Karski's family for going against his wishes of not being commemorated with monuments.

== Design ==
The monument is located in Estoril, placed at the corner of Clotilde Avenue and Arcadas do Parque Street, in front of the Estoril Garden, and near the Hotel Palácio and Estoril Casino. It consists of three bronze statues depicting the three men sitting on a bench. The main sculpture has a height of 0.9 m, a length of 3.1 m, and a width of 1.35 m.

Beside the monument stands a triangular pedestal with an inscription in Polish, English, and Portuguese, informing the public of the sacrifice of the numerous Polish emissaries during the Second World War. The pavement on both sides of the sculpture is decorated with large mosaics depicting the coat of arms of Poland and Portugal. The inscriptions are:

Portuguese inscription
Os três emissários polacos
que atravessaram o Atlântico levando informação sobre a Polónia ocupada

Jan Karski
1914–2000
Jerzy Lerski
1917–1992
Jan Nowak-Jeziorański
1914–2005

Foi graças a estes homens
e a dezenas de outros heróis anónimos
que o terror da Segunda Guerra Mundial
chegou mais cedo ao fim.
A sua coragem e sabedoria contribuíram
para as bases do sistema transatlântico.
Passados setenta anos, o atlantismo continua a ser chave
para a paz e a estabilidade das nações europeias.

Embaixada da Polónia em Portugal, Boleslaw Misztal, embaixador
Câmara Municipal de Cascais, Carlos Carreiras, presidente
Familia Spritzman-Jordan, patronos

Estoril, 3 de maio de 2016

English inscription
Three Polish Emissaries
crossed the Atlantic during World War II
carrying information from occupied Poland

Jan Karski
1914–2000
Jerzy Lerski
1917–1992
Jan Nowak-Jeziorański
1914–2005

They, as well as dozens of unnamed heroes, helped to bring an end to the war's terrors.
Their courage and wisdom
contributed to the foundations
of the Transatlantic System.
Seventy years later
Atlantic ideas remain the key
to the peace and stability of European nations.

Embassy of Poland to Portugal, Boleslaw Misztal, ambassador
The city of Cascais, Carlos Carreiras, mayor
The Spritzman-Jordan family, patrons

Estroil, May 3, 2016

Polish inscription
Trzej polscy emisariusze
w czasie II wojny światowej przekraczali atlantyk
z informacjami z okupowanej Polsk

Jan Karski
1914–2000
Jerzy Lerski
1917–1992
Jan Nowak-Jeziorański
1914–2005

Dzięki nim i dziesiątką innych
bezimiennych bohaterów
terror wojenny wygasł wczesniej.
Ich odwaga i mądrość stworzyły zręby Systemu Transatlantyckiego.
70 lat później idea atlantycka
pozostaje kluczem do pokoju i rozwoju naszych narodów.

Ambasada Polski w Portugalii, Bronislaw Misztal, ambasador
Rząd miasta Cascais, Carlos Carreiras, burmistrz
Rodzina Spritzman-Jordan, fundatorzy

Estoril, 3 maja 2016

Next to the sculpture is also placed the bust of Lucian Blaga, a 20th-century philosopher, poet, playwright, and novelist, designed by Aurel Gheorghe Ardelean.

== Gallery ==
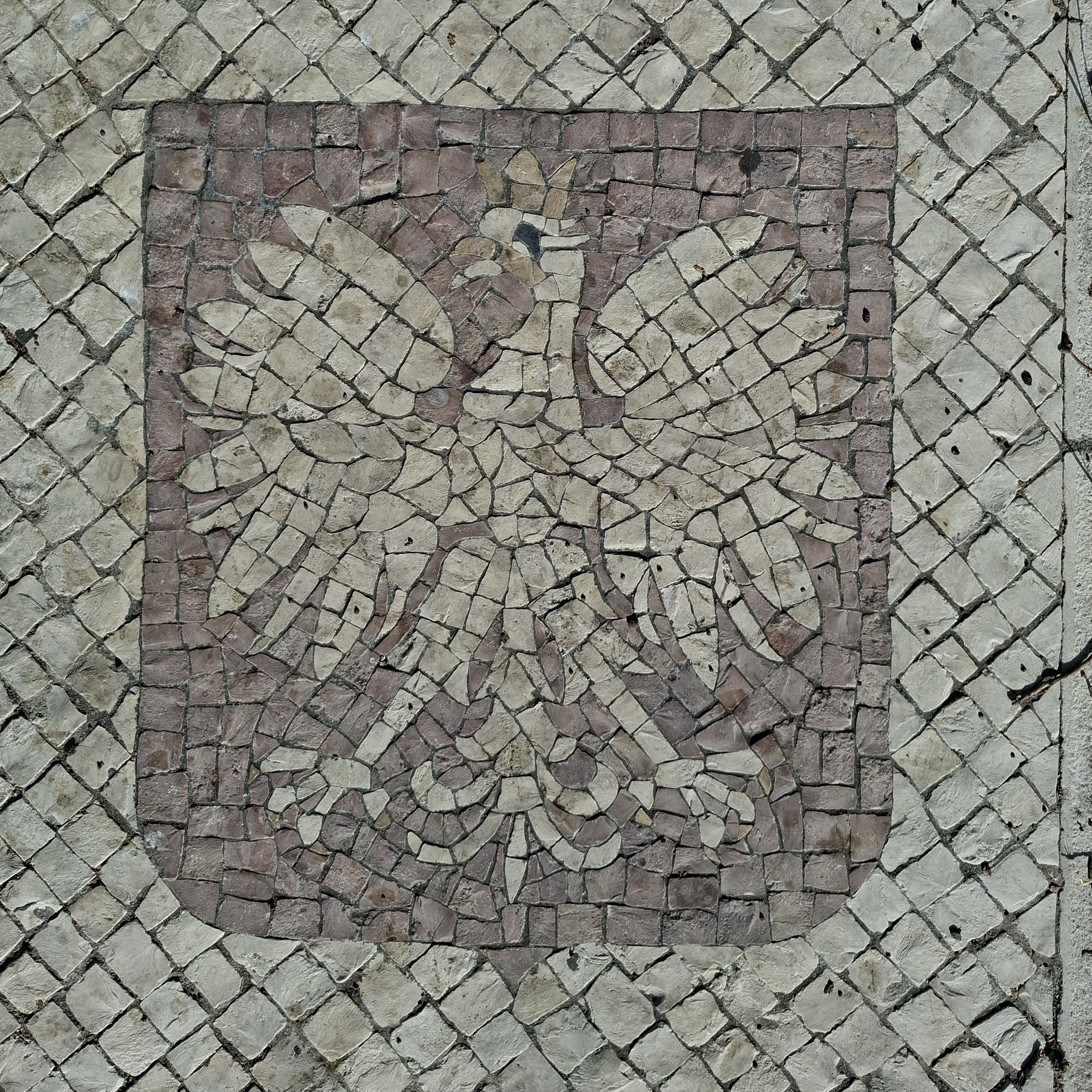
Mozaic of the coat of arms of Poland near the sculpture.

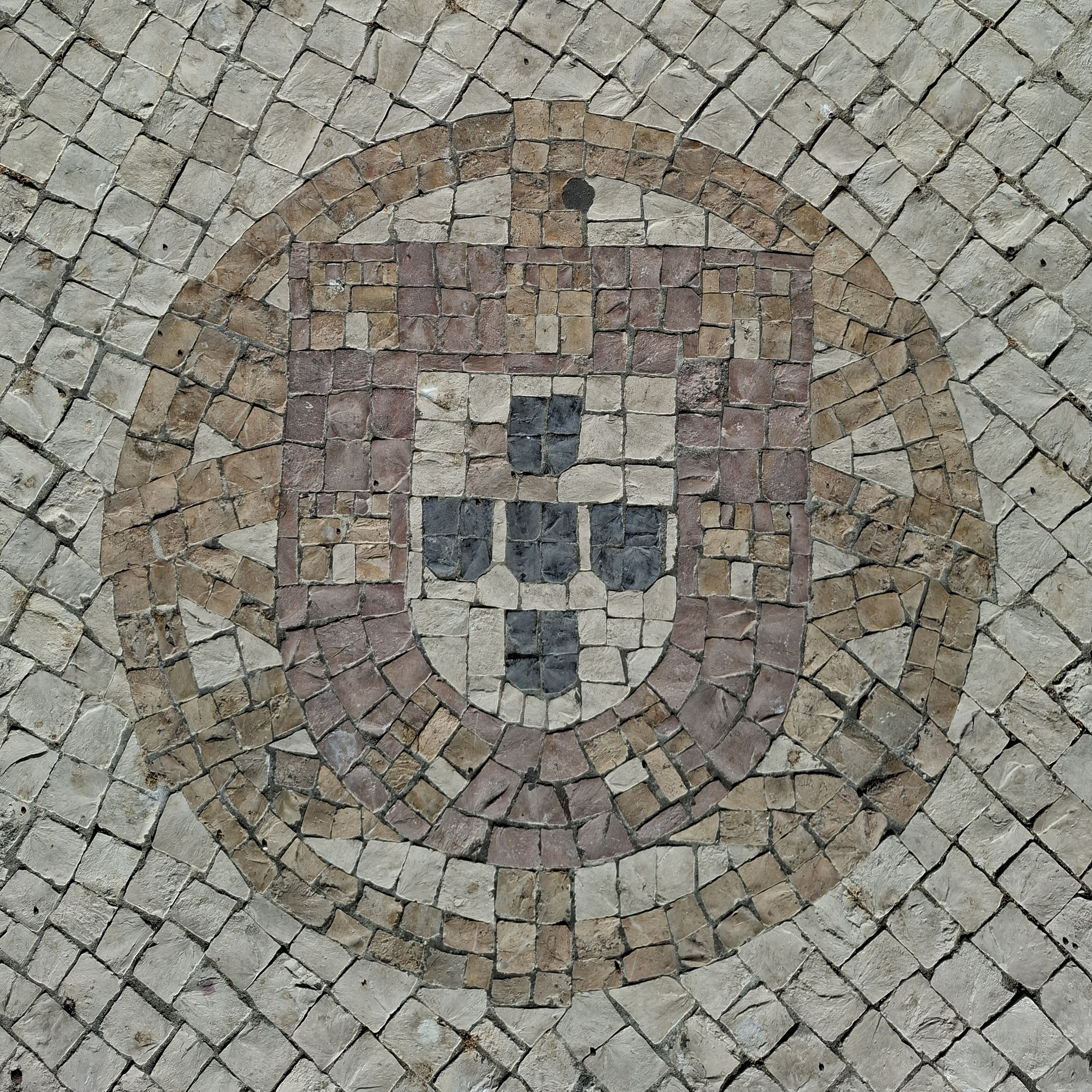
Mozaic of the coat of arms of Portugal near the sculpture.
