= Statue of Jan Karski (Washington, D.C.) =

Sculpture in Washington, D.C., United States

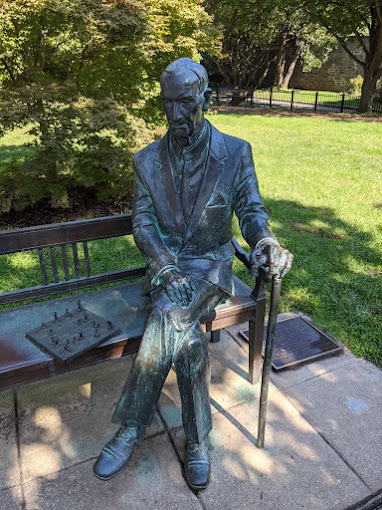
- The statue in 2025.
- Interactive map of Statue of Jan Karski
- Location: 37th Street, Washington, D.C., United States
- Coordinates: 38.908793°N 77.071843°W
- Designer: Karol Badyna
- Type: Statue, bench monument
- Material: Bronze
- Opening date: September 17, 2002
- Dedicated to: Jan Karski

The statue of Jan Karski, also known as the Jan Karski Bench (Polish pronunciation: [ˈjan ˈkar.ski]; Polish: Ławeczka Jana Karskiego), is a bronze statue at 37th Street in Washington, D.C., United States, at the campus of the Georgetown University. It is dedicated to Jan Karski (1914–2000), a 20th-century soldier, diplomat, and political scientist, who, as a member of the Polish resistance, reported to the Western Allies about the state of occupied Poland, Germany's destruction of the Warsaw Ghetto and its operation of extermination camps on Polish soil. He is depicted sitting on a bench, playing chess. It was designed by Karol Badyna, and unveiled on September 17, 2002.

== History ==
The monument was dedicated to Jan Karski (1914–2000), a 20th-century soldier, diplomat, and political scientist, who, as a member of the Polish resistance, reported to the Western Allies about state of occupied Poland, Germany's destruction of the Warsaw Ghetto and its operation of extermination camps on Polish soil. The sculpture was designed by Karol Badyna, and unveiled on September 17, 2002, at the campus of Georgetown University, where Karski thought at from 1952 to 1992. It was financed by the Ministry of Foreign Affairs of Poland, and Polish-American community.

Its author, Karol Badyna, would be later commissioned to make several more memorials dedicated to Karski. This included identical copies in Kielce (2005), New York City (2007), and Tel Aviv (2009), as well as original designs in Łódź (2009), Warsaw (2013), Kraków (2016), and Estoril (2016). The statues were later criticized by Karski's family, stating that he was against being commemorated with monuments, as well as by them having form of benches.

== Design ==
The bronze statue depicts Jan Karski, seated on one side of a bench, with his legs crossed and his left hand resting on a cane, and a chessboard with pieces set beside him. There is room on the opposite side of the bench for visitors to sit as if to participate in a chess match.
