= Adam Puławski =

Polish historian

Adam Puławski is a Polish historian and former researcher for the Institute of National Remembrance (IPN). His research focuses on the Polish Underground State and the Polish government-in-exile and their actions toward the Jewish citizens of Poland during the Holocaust. Puławski has argued that the Polish government often treated Polish Jews as foreigners and their extermination as a secondary issue. In contrast to claims made by the Law and Justice party that the Polish government-in-exile did its best to help the Polish Jews, Puławski found that there were attempts to censor news of the fate of Jews. Moreover, Puławski argued that there are historical myths about Jan Karski. According to his research, Karski's mission was not devoted to alerting the Western Allies to the Holocaust.

== Career ==
After working for the Institute of National Remembrance for eighteen years, in 2018, he was transferred to a different division of the institution where he would not have the opportunity to do historical research. At least 130 historians from various countries, including Timothy Snyder and Norman Davies, signed a letter objecting to this decision and stating that it would not help the credibility of the IPN. Because he was not allowed to do historical research, Puławski quit. Puławski said that the IPN was focusing too much on how Jews treated Poles during the war: "if a Jew survived and had to steal a carrot at the same time, for example because he was starving—now we are to say that this Jew is evil"—and seeking to portray Jews as ungrateful for Polish rescue attempts. In contrast, Puławski believes that in order to achieve an accurate and balanced historical interpretation, it is necessary to examine the entire situation, rather than one aspect of it, and to leave moral judgements to the reader.

Publication of his 2018 book was blocked by the IPN, but Puławski collected 24,000 zł in donations and had it published by the Rocznik Chełmski association. The book received positive evaluations in academic journals and Andrzej Żbikowski of the Jewish Historical Institute stated, "In further research on the extermination of the Jewish population, the results of his [Puławski's] research cannot be omitted in silence or ignored". Writing about Puławski's 2009 book, Wojtek Rappak wrote that his "meticulous study of the flow of information about the Holocaust, from the local to the various higher levels of the underground state and then on to London, looks like the definitive study on the subject." The book was denounced by the right-wing historian Wojciech Muszyński who described Puławski as a "sick man".

In September 2020, he received his habilitation from the Maria Curie-Skłodowska University. He had to pay the fees (about 20,000 zł) himself, and has been unemployed for much of the time since leaving the IPN. Then he worked in the Jerzy Kłoczowski Laboratory of the Institute of East-Central Europe ("Grodzka Gate - NN Theater" Center). Now he is unemployed again.

== Works ==
- Puławski, Adam (2009). W obliczu zagłady: Rząd RP na Uchodźstwie, Delegatura Rządu RP na Kraj, ZWZ-AK wobec deportacji Żydow do obozów zagłady (1941-1942) (in Polish). Instytut Pamięci Narodowej. ISBN 978-83-7629-088-1.
- Puławski, Adam (2018). Wobec "niespotykanego w dziejach mordu": Rząd RP na uchodźstwie, Delegatura Rządu RP na Kraj, AK a eksterminacja ludności żydowskiej od "wielkiej akcji" do powstania w getcie warszawskiem (in Polish). Stowarzyszenie Rocznik Chełmski. ISBN 978-83-946468-2-0.

Wykluczenie czy samowykluczenie? Trzy aspekty obecności Żydów w wojennym społeczeństwie polskim na przykładzie 1942 roku, „Pamięć i Sprawiedliwość” 2008, nr 1 (12)

Postrzeganie żydowskich oddziałów partyzanckich przez Armię Krajową i Delegaturę Rządu RP na Kraj, „Pamięć i Sprawiedliwość” 2003, nr 2 (4)

Sowiecki partyzant–polski problem, „Pamięć i Sprawiedliwość” 2006, nr 1 (9)

„6 tys.(Żydów) co dzień”–„oczywiście na stracenie”. Opowieść o pierwszej depeszy Polskiego Państwa Podziemnego na temat Wielkiej Akcji w getcie warszawskim

Nie ujawniać czynnikom nieoficjalnym. Depesze AK o Zagładzie, „Pamięć i Sprawiedliwość” 2017, nr 1 (29)

Czy odbijano Sobibór, „Więź” 2003, nr 4.

„Aktion Reinhardt”: Zagłada Żydów w dystrykcie lubelskim 1942-1943 r. [w:] Hitlerowski obóz pracy Poniatowa 1942-1944 : materiały I Międzynarodowej Konferencji Historycznej, Poniatowa 4 listopada 2004 r., red. A. Podgórski, A. Mączkowska, Poniatowa 2008.

Polityka informacyjna Polskiego Państwa Podziemnego w odniesieniu do Zagłady [w:] Przemoc i dzień powszedni w okupowanej Polsce, red. T. Chinciński, Gdańsk 2011.

Die Informationspolityk des polnischen Untergrundstaates und der Holocaust [w:] Gewalt und Alltag im besetzten Polen 1939-1945, red. J. Böhler, S. Lehnstaedt, Osnabrück 2012.

Problematyka żydowska w wydawnictwach Kazimierza Czernickiego, „Rocznik Chełmski” 2012, t. 16.

Kontrowersje w biografiach znanych chełmian, „Rocznik Chełmski” 2012, t. 16.

The Polish Government-in-exile in London, the Delegatura, the Union of Armed Struggle-Home Army and the Extermination of the Jews, “Holocaust Studies: A Journal of Culture and History” 2012, nr 2-3 (A. Puławski, The Polish Government-in-exile in London, the Delegatura, the Union of Armed Struggle-Home Army and the Extermination of the Jews [w:] Governments-in-Exile and the Jews during the Second World War, red. J. Lánicĕk, J. Jordan, London, Portland 2013).

Problematyka żydowska w „Kronice Nadbużańskiej”, „Rocznik Chełmski” 2013, t. 17.

Kwestia sowieckich jeńców wojennych w polityce Polskiego Państwa Podziemnego, „Rocznik Chełmski” 2014, t. 18.

Antysemickie jednodniówki na chełmskim rynku wydawniczym (1929-1939), „Rocznik Chełmski” 2015, t. 19.

Polskie Państwo Podziemne wobec kwestii sowieckich jeńców wojennych [w:] Jeńcy sowieccy na ziemiach polskich w czasie II wojny światowej, red. J. Wojtkowiaka, Warszawa 2015.

Polskie Państwo Podziemne wobec Zagłady, „Kwartalnik Historii Żydów” 2015, nr 2.

1939. Stosunki polsko-żydowskie w Chełmie w przededniu II wojny światowej, „Rocznik Chełmski” 2016, t. 20.

„Wysłać ludzi na trasę”. O planach odbicia przez Armię Krajową transportów więźniów. Przyczynek, „Rocznik Lubelski” 2016, t. XLII.

Żydzi [w:] Dzieje Lubelszczyzny 1944-1956. Aspekty społeczne, gospodarcze, oświatowe i kulturalne, red. T. Osiński, M. Mazur, Lublin 2017.

Charakterystyka „Chelmer Nachrichten. Wiadomości Chełmskie”, „Rocznik Chełmski” 2017, t. 21.

Funkcjonowanie urzędu powierniczego na przykładzie Chełma, „Zagłada Żydów. Studia i materiały” 2017, t. 13.

„Same nieszczęścia wojny i tak ludzi do Boga zbliżają”. Postawy księży katolickich podczas II wojny światowej na podstawie dokumentów archiwum dekanatu chełmskiego, „Rocznik Lubelski” 2018, t. XLIV.

Urzędy powiernicze w Chełmie w okresie II wojny światowej, „Rocznik Chełmski” 2018, t. 22.

„Benzyny zużyto 8 litrów”. Prozaizacja Zagłady na przykładzie dokumentacji Archiwum Państwowego w Lublinie Oddział w Chełmie, „Zagłada Żydów. Studia i materiały” 2018, t. 14.

Trzecia (ostatnia) misja kurierska Jana Karskiego. Mity i rzeczywistość, ohistorie, Lublin 2019.

Getta na terenie Generalnego Gubernatorstwa, Akcja „Reinhardt”-w kręgu Zagłady (Teatr NN), Lublin 2019.

Akcja „Reinhardt” w dystrykcie krakowskim, Akcja „Reinhardt”-w kręgu Zagłady (Teatr NN), Lublin 2020.

Akcja „Reinhardt” w dystrykcie radomskim, Akcja „Reinhardt”-w kręgu Zagłady (Teatr NN), Lublin 2021.

Jan Karski’s Final Mission, “Israel Journal of Foreign Affairs”, 2021.

Raport polskiego rządu: „News is reaching the Polish Government in London about liquidation of the Jewish ghetto in Warsaw”, @historia-Historia Bez Kitu, Lublin 2023.

Kto naprawdę napisał „Raport Karskiego”?, @historia-Historia Bez Kitu, Lublin 2023.

Rozważania w 80. rocznicę wybuchu powstania w obozie zagłady w Sobiborze, @historia-Historia Bez Kitu, Lublin 2023.

Krótki informator o obozach zagłady (wybrane pojęcia), @historia-Historia Bez Kitu, Lublin 2024.

Akcja Reinhardt w getcie warszawskim, Leksykon Ośrodka „Brama Grodzka - Teatr NN”, Lublin 2025.

Powstanie w obozie zagłady w Treblince (1943), Leksykon Ośrodka „Brama Grodzka - Teatr NN”, Lublin 2025.

Powstanie w obozie zagłady w Sobiborze, Leksykon Ośrodka „Brama Grodzka - Teatr NN”, Lublin 2026.

Przypisy
