= Historical Dictionary of Poland, 966–1945 =

1996 book

- Author: George J. Lerski
- Genre: Non-fiction
- Publication date: 1996
- Followed by: Historical Dictionary of Poland, 1945-1996

Historical Dictionary of Poland, 966–1945 is a 1996 book by George J. Lerski described as the "authoritative, historical dictionary of Poland".

In 1999 it received a sequel by Piotr Wróbel, Historical Dictionary of Poland, 1945-1996.
