= Pola Nirenska =

Polish dancer and choreographer (1910-1992)

- Pola Nirensztajn
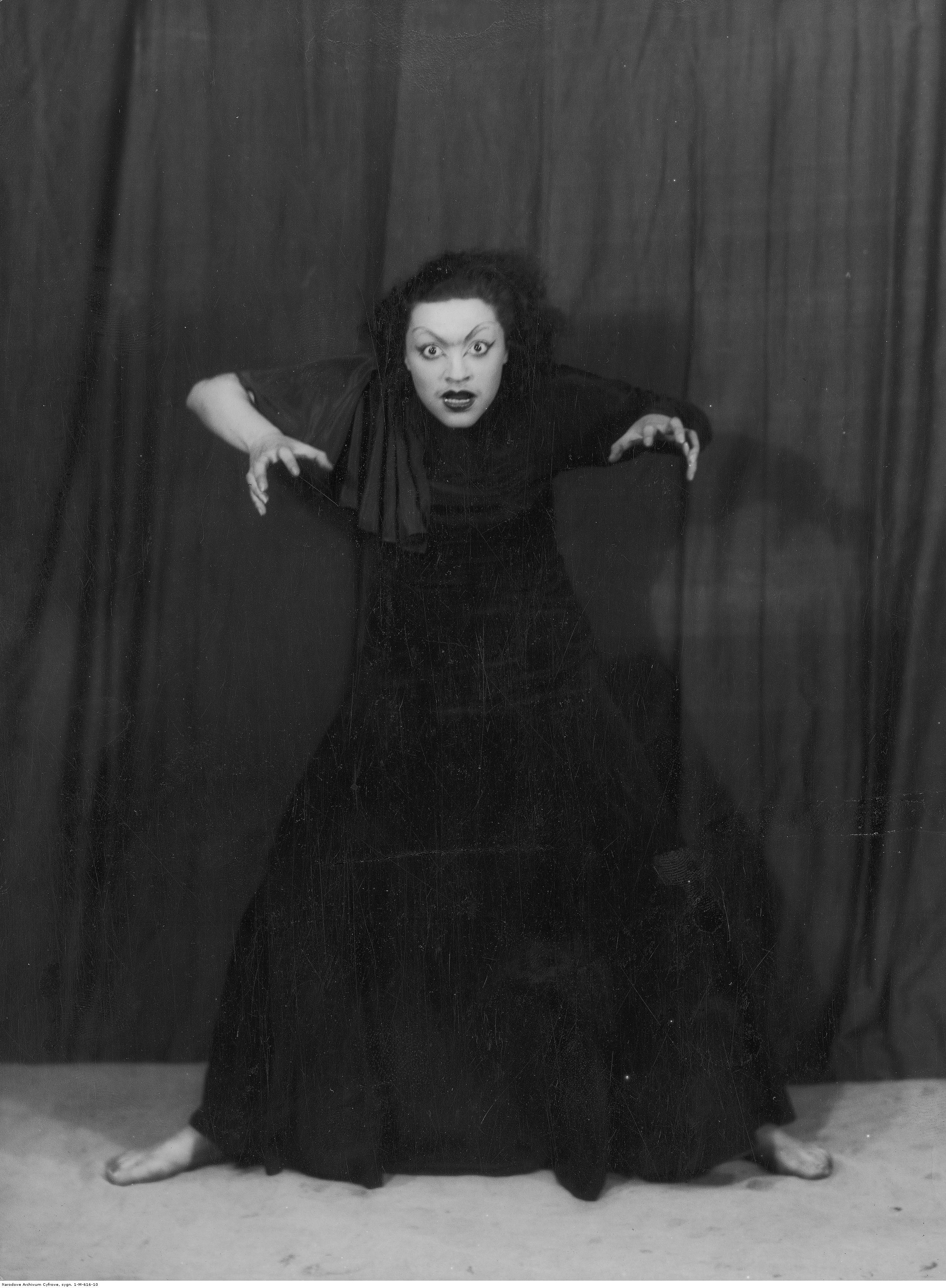
- Pola Nirenska performing Krzyk (Cry) in 1933 at the International Competition for Solo Dance
- Born: July 28, 1910; Warsaw, Congress Poland, Russian Empire
- Died: July 25, 1992 (aged 81); Bethesda, Maryland, U.S.
- Education: Wigman School
- Notable work: Cry (1934); A Scarecrow Remembers (1946); In Memory of Those I Loved...Who Are No More (1990)
- Movement: Modern dance
- Spouse(s): John Justinian de Ledesma (m. 1946; div. 1949); Jan Karski (m. 1965)
- Awards: Eighth place 1933 International Competition for Solo Dance; First prize (choreography); 1934 Cry – International Dance Congress; Second prize (performance); 1934 Cry – International Dance Congress

Pola Nirenska (28 July 1910 — 25 July 1992), born Pola Nirensztajn, was a Polish performer of modern dance. She had a critically acclaimed if brief career in Austria, Germany, Italy, and Poland in the 1930s before fleeing the continent in 1935 due to rising antisemitism. She spent 14 years in the United Kingdom, primarily entertaining refugees, troops, and war workers. She emigrated to the United States in 1949 and settled in Washington, D.C., where she was widely acknowledged as the city's leading choreographer and performer of modern dance until her death.

== Early life ==
Nirenska was born Pola Nirensztajn (Note: The last name is sometimes anglicized as Nierenstein.) on 28 July 1910 in Warsaw, Poland, which at that time was part of the Russian Empire. Her parents, Mordechaj and Ita (née Waksmann), were observant Jews. She had three siblings. The family was well-off, as Nirenska's father made men's neckties for a living. She exhibited a strong interest in dance from a very early age. Nirenska was nine years old when she received her first formal training in dance (at a summer dance camp for girls), and 15 years old when she choreographed her first work (a solo piece, performed in the family kitchen, set to Camille Saint-Saëns' Danse macabre). In her teens, she attended a Roman Catholic high school for the arts. She secretly took a class in ballet. Finding she did not like it, she switched to a class in modern dance.

When she was 17 years old, Mordechaj Nirensztajn came home from a business trip to Germany with information on several dance academies. Pola asked permission to attend one of these schools, and her parents refused. She locked herself in her bedroom for three days, refusing to eat or sleep until they relented. (Note: They indicated their permission by slipping her passport under her door.) In return, she promised her parents that she would only teach and choreograph, not perform.

=== Dance training under Mary Wigman ===
Her father sold a building which he had purchased in Berlin, and agreed to use the profit he made to finance her dance training. (Note: The profits were to have been used for Nirenska's dowry.) Nirenska was accepted at the Wigman School, (Note: Also known as the Wigman Central Institute and the Dresden Central Institute.) a music and dance school established in Dresden by Expressionist dance pioneer Mary Wigman in the fall of 1920. Nirenska began her studies in 1929 at the age of 18.

The Wigman School offered a three-year program that included courses in anatomy, music, and pedagogy (the theory and practice of teaching) along with intensive instruction in dance. Students were also required to take courses in the liberal arts, such as art, philosophy, and religion, to study piano and accompaniment. Dance instruction covered the entire spectrum of dance, with a focus on composition (tänzerische Gestaltung), expression (Ausdruck), and technique (Technik). Both "technical skills lessons" and "class (compositional) lessons" used improvisation as the basic teaching method. Circling, locomotive scales, spinning, and vibration were some of the technical skills taught, (Note: Circling involved rotation of the hips to express a dynamic quality or to move the dancer through space. Locomotive scales were Wigman's theory of movement, based on the work of Rudolf von Laban, in which a prescribed set of motions expressed the relationship between space and dynamism. Spinning involved techniques using the placement of feet, displacement of the hips, and posture to spin, move forward, or move through a circle or spiral pattern. Vibration was the use of short, steady pulses of movement, localized in a part of the body or to move the body through space. Vibration helped the dancer avoid extremely athletic jumping or leaping.) while the interplay of energy, space, and time were explored in class lessons. To complete their studies, a student had to present a concert of group and solo works, as well as submit to a written thesis. When Nirenska enrolled at the Wigman School, there were about 360 students (several dozen of them professionals seeking additional training) and 14 teachers. Nearly all the students were women and middle-class, even though the school's cost was rather high. A certificate from the Wigman School was highly regarded in Germany, and many graduates went immediately into teaching or choreography (foregoing a dance career).

Pola Nirenska was one of the most prominent students at the Wigman School, but not the top student. She was not a disciplined dancer, and reacted negatively when punished. Wigman considered Nirenska "pudgy" and too much of a beginner. The top student was Rosalia Chladek, whose sparse movement was highly evocative. Nirenska's best marks were in her dance and percussion classes. Indeed, in her second year, Nirenska taught percussion classes on her own. Her capstone thesis was on "Women and the Arts", and she graduated with honors.

== European career ==
=== First professional tour and dismissal by Wigman ===
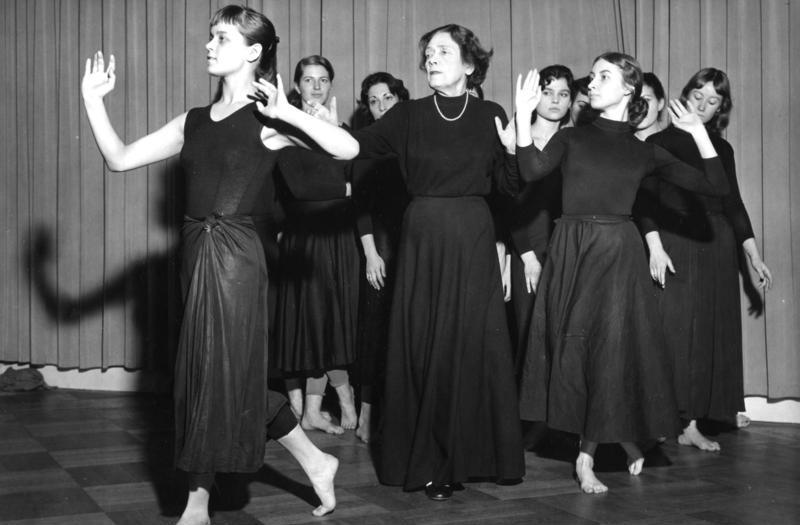
Mary Wigman (wearing necklace) in 1959

After graduating from the Wigman School in 1932, Nirenska joined Wigman's 14-member all-women modern dance group. Wigman had toured the United States in a critically acclaimed tour from December 1930 to March 1931. She made a second solo tour from December 1931 to April 1932. By mid-1932, the Great Depression had caused many students to drop out of her school and financing for dance performances had become scarce in Germany. In July 1932, American producer Sol Hurok traveled to Germany to interest Wigman in a tour of South America. Instead, Wigman proposed creating a 12-member group of her most advanced students and touring the United States with her new piece, Der Weg (The Journey). Nirenska was one of the 12 dancers admitted to the new troupe. Wigman began rehearsing Nirenska and the 11 other dancers in September 1932. Reaction to previews in Dresden and Berlin in December 1932 were mixed. The Wigman Dance Group arrived in New York City just before Christmas 1932. Audiences were disappointed, finding the 12 dancers who moved around Wigman to be not up to professional standards. Wigman herself appeared only sparingly in the piece. The tour ended on 5 March 1933. Hurok sent her last paycheck for the tour to Nirenska's now-impoverished parents in Warsaw.

Upon the troupe's return to Germany, Nirenska later said, Wigman immediately dismissed her Jewish students and fired all Jewish staff associated with her school. This included Fred Coolemans, one of her closest collaborators since 1927 and the individual who ran the Wigman School while Wigman was on tour. Adolf Hitler had come to power on 30 January 1933, and his supporters were in control of most of the critical government ministries. Whether Wigman acted out of her own anti-semitic views or under pressure by the Nazi regime is a matter of some dispute. Many sources claim Wigman was personally anti-semitic. Dance historian Marion Kant traces the emergence of Wigman's anti-semitism to the early 1920s. She continued to admit Jews as students to her school and as dancers in her troupe because, Kant concludes, Wigman believed they were "purified" by submitting to her purist dance ideology. Dance historian Alexandra Kolb calls Wigman an anti-semitic sympathizer. In their study of modern dance under the Nazi regime, Lillian Karina and Marion Kant conclude that Wigman's sudden anti-Jewish policy was unforced. They point to extensive evidence in Wigman's own papers, and note that Wigman's anti-semitic rules were implemented several months before the Reich Ministry of Public Enlightenment and Propaganda imposed anti-Semitic regulations in July 1933. Kolb, too, concludes that Wigman willingly collaborated with Nazi regime. Dance historian Isa Partsch-Bergsohn disagrees, saying Wigman only acted under pressure from the Ministry of Propaganda. The Library of Congress biography of Nirenska claims that Wigman found Nazi "soldiers" surrounding her school upon her troupe's return to Germany in March 1933, and that Wigman was forced to dismiss her colleagues and students. Wigman herself wrote to Nirenska in February 1951 and said that she had only dismissed Jews and joined Nazi cultural organizations because it was the only way she and her school could survive. Although Nirenska seems to have held ill feelings toward Wigman about the incident, there is extensive evidence that the two women maintained a close friendship. They exchanged letters before World War II, and many afterward. In this correspondence, Wigman was much more emotional and informal with Nirenska than with she was with her most frequent correspondent, Hanya Holm.

=== Later career in Europe ===
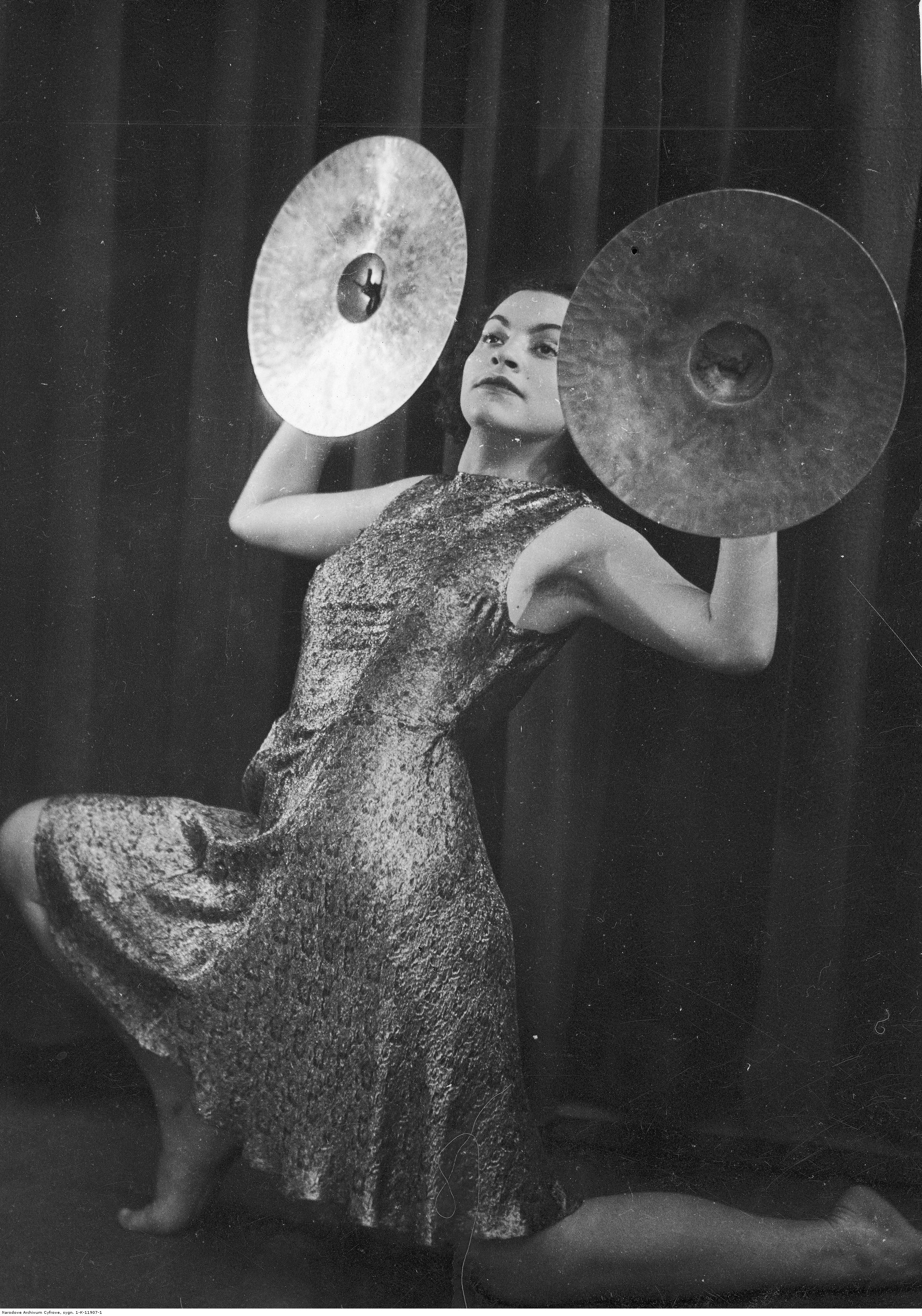
Nirenska about 1933 or 1934

The Nazis' rise to power prompted Nirenska to leave Germany and settle in her native Warsaw, where she taught dance for a year at the Warsaw Conservatory and established her own small modern dance group. At the International Dance Competition for Solo Dancers in Warsaw in August 1933, she won the eighth-place prize. She received a first prize for choreography and a second prize for performing for her original solo work Cry, which she debuted at the International Dance Congress in Vienna, Austria, in early June 1934. (She never performed Cry again.) Wigman then invited her to stay in Dresden in the summer of 1934. When Nirenska saw a Nazi flag hanging outside Wigman's home and Wigman's secretary wearing an SS uniform, she left without seeing her former teacher. She received a grant from the Polish government to further her studies in dance. Nirenska relocated to Vienna, where she studied dance with Rosalia Chladek. Chladek's style was not to her liking, however, and she returned to Poland after a few months.

The International Dance Congress recognition led to a tour of Europe. Richard Pearson, writing 58 years later, said critics found her program of solo performances "brilliant" and dance critic Alan M. Kriegsman said her European years were distinguished.

The Theater in der Josefstadt brought Nirenska to Vienna in May 1935 for a series of concerts. Each performance consisted of 12 solos. Shortly thereafter, Angelo Sartorios, choreographer at the Teatro Comunale (the state opera house in Florence, Italy), asked her to perform as a soloist dancer in a production of the opera Aida. She taught dance classes for children, but the language barrier proved insurmountable; Nirenska called her classes "awful". Nirenska left Florence after just three months when the Mussolini regime invaded Ethiopia in October 1935 (causing strained relations with Poland). All her costumes were stolen during her flight to Vienna. She asked her father for financial assistance. He agreed, provided she never dance in public again. Nirenska declined.

Nirenska was alarmed by rising anti-semitism in Europe, and decided to leave the continent. Through the help of a friend, Nirenska was able to emigrate to the United Kingdom in 1935.

== Career during World War II ==
In the first four and a half years in Britain, Nirenska studied dance with Kurt Jooss and Sigurd Leeder, She choreographed several new solo pieces based on Polish folk dances, and gave recitals of these and other solo pieces. She performed one of these dances in the 1937 revue, It's in the Bag!, at the Saville Theatre. She modeled for fashion designers and for artists like the sculptor Jacob Epstein. After its founding in 1939 and until about 1942, Nirenska worked extensively with the Council for the Encouragement of Music and the Arts. This new organization, which hired unemployed or poverty-stricken performers as well as exiles, brought cinema, dance, music, and plays to isolated places like mining village or where people needed relief from stress (like factories or air raid shelters).

In 1940, Nirenska learned that more than 75 members of her extended family were murdered in The Holocaust. Her parents and brother escaped death by fleeing to Mandatory Palestine. For the next six years, she danced extensively for military personnel and for the Polish government-in-exile, but choreographed no new pieces. Feeling that audiences had too much tension and tragedy in their lives, she only performed in light-hearted pieces during the war. She also danced in the 1942 revue Waltz Without End at the Cambridge Theatre in 1942. Nirenska later said that she danced more frequently during the war than at any other time in her life.

In 1946, Nirenska married John Justinian de Ledesma, a film and theater actor who used the stage name John Justin. She opened a dance studio and began creating new solo pieces again. Among the pieces she created were A Scarecrow Remembers (1946), which became one of her most noted creations. She went on a British-sponsored series of performances in Tel Aviv and Jerusalem in March and April 1947.

Nirenska divorced Justin in 1949, and emigrated to the United States that same year.

== American career ==
=== Studying: 1949–1950 ===
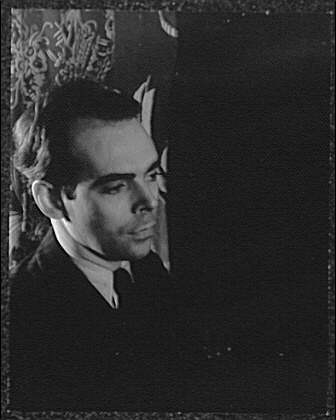
Charles Weidman. Nirenska studied under him for about two years, and said he was her favorite teacher

Nirenska was invited to move to the United States by dancer Ted Shawn, who wanted her to perform at the 1950 Jacob's Pillow Dance Festival, held in the summer at his Jacob's Pillow Farm near Becket, Massachusetts. (Note: One of Nirenska's friends, a man who was a member of Shawn's dance troupe, told Shawn about her.)

For much of 1949 and 1950, Nirenska lived in New York City, washing dishes to earn money. She was extremely poor; she often had too little to eat, and her weight dropped to 105 pounds (48 kg). Nevertheless, she immersed herself in dance studies: For most of her time in England, she had worked alone, and now she craved more knowledge. Initially, she studied the techniques of Martha Graham. Although Graham's spinning was similar to the Wigman's, Graham's contraction-and-release style was ill-suited to Nirenska's physique. Shawn recommended that she train with Doris Humphrey. Humphrey and her dance partner, Charles Weidman, assisted Nirenska and looked out for her. Nirenska studied dance with both Humphrey and Weidman. She learned Humphrey's theories and techniques of fall-and-recovery and opposition-and-succession, which helped add more powerful movements to her performance, and was so excited by Humphrey's course on composition that she took it twice. Nirenska spent most of the summers of 1950, 1951, and part of 1952 as a guest at Humphrey's home in New London, Connecticut. Humphrey oversaw the summer dance school there, and Nirenska learned how to do reconstruction of dances and received feedback regarding her own choreography.

Nirenska also studied modern dance under José Limón. Limón had studied dance under Humphrey and Weidman for 10 years, and was not only Weidman's best pupil but also his lover. Limón formed his own dance company in 1946 with Humphrey as artistic director, and he built on Humphrey's ideas to build techniques in which performers mold the body to express ideas and emotions. She also worked with choreographer and composer Louis Horst. Horst had studied with Wigman in 1925, returning to the United States with a profound interest in indigenous and folk danceways as well as a stronger appreciation for the ways in which choreography and music could contrast and complement one another in modern dance.

Humphrey, Weidman, Limón, and Horse all provided lessons and training to Nirenska for free. Weidman, however, was her favorite teacher.

=== Teaching and dancing: 1950–1952 ===
Dancer and teacher Jan Veen, who was in the process of founding the Dance Division at the Boston Conservatory, invited her to perform in Boston. She made her professional North American debut under the auspices of the Boston Dance Theatre on February 16, 1950. Her program included Eastern Ballad, A Scarecrow Remembers, St. Bridget: Stained-Glass Window, Sarabande for the Dead Queen, La Puerta Del Vino, Peasant Lullaby, Mad Girl, Dancer's Dilemma, and Unwanted Child, and was critically acclaimed. To earn a living in Massachusetts, she taught at the Berkshire Playhouse Drama School in Stockbridge, Massachusetts.

Shawn paid for her living expenses at Jacob's Pillow while she composed and rehearsed for her festival performance. She performed modern dance solos (the only performer to represent modern dance) in the first week's program in late June. Her program consisted of Dancer's Dilemma, Street Girl, Eastern Ballad, Village Beauty, and A Scarecrow Remembers.

Her old teacher, Rudolf von Laban, introduced Nirenska to his eldest daughter, Juana de Laban, in 1951. Dr. de Laban was head of the dance department at Adelphi University in New York City and hired Nirenska to teach in the college's summer program in 1951. She also taught in the dance arts program at Carnegie Hall. Nirenska made her New York City debut on May 1, 1952. She and other dancers performed several Polish folk dances under the title "Impressions of Poland" at the American Museum of Natural History as part of the museum's "Around the World With Dance and Song" series.

Dancer Evelyn de la Tour asked Nirenska to teach modern dance at a summer school near her home in Sedgwick, Maine. De la Tour was so impressed with Nirenska's abilities that she invited her to become co-director of and a partner in the de la Tour dance studio in Washington, D.C. There was pressure on Nirenska to leave New York City. Doris Humphreys and Hanya Holm both wanted to avoid competing with her, and advised her to set out on her own. Nirenska herself knew that with so many dancers in New York City, finding performance and teaching opportunities would be difficult. Washington, however, had few resident dancers or dance studios, and the capital was hungry for fine art.

=== Early years in D.C. ===
Nirenska permanently settled in D.C. in 1952. She taught at de la Tour's studio, Dance Workshop, which was located at 1518 Wisconsin Avenue NW. The two also taught dance at four area private schools: Madeira School and Potomac School, both located in McLean, Virginia; the National Cathedral School for Girls in Washington, D.C.; and Piedmont Day School in Alexandria, Virginia. Life was not easy: Nirenska lived in a small room at the back of the studio which contained her bedroom and a kitchenette. She had to share a bathroom with the students. She learned how to teach children and beginning students from de la Tour, who also encouraged her to teach less and choreograph more. Soon, she was choreographing solo and group works for advanced students.

She made her professional Washington debut on May 29, 1953, at Cardozo High School. Ethel Butler, a former pupil of Martha Graham's, presented dances in the style of Graham, while Nirenska performed dances in the style of Expressionism. She performed several times at the Pageant of Peace near the National Christmas Tree in December 1954.

Nirenska partnered with Butler to form their own dance troupe, the Washington Dance Company, in the spring of 1956. She choreographed mostly group dances during this period, and only a single solo. (Note: Except for a few very early group pieces written when she was living in Poland, all of Nirenska's group dances date from her time in Washington, D.C. The lone solo was Eternal Insomnia of Earth, which was highly Expressionistic.) In her own dancing, Nirenska worked to reduce her dependency on Wigman and Expressionism and embrace the more lyrical, emotional style then present in American modern dance. Naima Prevots, who danced with Nirenska in the 1960s, believes that not only was Nirenska embracing America and American culture and feeling more American herself, but she felt antagonistic to Wigman and German Expressionism for betraying Jewish dancers in 1933. Nirenska was invited to the 1958 American Dance Festival in New London, Connecticut, where she performed two solo pieces, Vigil By The Sea and The Eternal Fool. In the summer of 1959, she taught dance at a summer program held at Utah State University.

Her success as a teacher had parents pressing her to open her own studio in 1956. Three years later, a group of parents loaned her $15,000 ($200,000 in 2025 dollars), and in October 1960 she opened the Pola Nirenska School of Modern Dance at 4601 Grant Road NW. Her studio proved so popular that Nirenska was able to repay the loan within six years. Nirenska stopped performing about 1960 as well, devoting herself to choreography.

=== First retirement ===
Nirenska and her husband, Jan Karski, took a vacation in Mexico in the summer of 1966, during which she took film of their vacation. Encouraged by the reaction to her films, Nirenska began an intense study of photography and filmmaking, taking several courses in it. She also began making films of dances, most of them featuring young performers. She filmed Marian Scott performing Three Energies; Murray Louis performing Chimera; dance phrases developed by Norman Walker and performed by Walker and dancer Ruth Currier; selections of performances by Erick Hawkins and Don Redlich; and improvisations by some of her students. All the films depicted dancers in practice costumes, so audiences could see the movement more clearly.

During 1967 and 1968, Nirenska entered her photographs in several shows, winning a number of awards and prizes. She began making portraits of friends, which led to an emerging career as a portrait photographer.

Nirenska abruptly retired in 1968, even though she was still very highly regarded as a teacher, choreographer, and dancer. She accompanied her husband on a State Department tour of Greece, Lebanon, and Turkey from December 1966 to January 1967, during which she gave lectures on dance and modern dance workshops. In April 1968, Nirenska announced her retirement and the closure of her dance studio. The stress of running a studio had become too much for her, she said. She finally made her decision to retire when her husband asked her to.

In retirement, Nirenska engaged in volunteer work such as chauffeuring older women and answering a hotline. She devoted time to gardening, travel, and working on her photography. She suffered from severe depression and mental illness, and spent years undergoing inpatient and outpatient treatment at St. Elizabeths Hospital, the large federally run psychiatric facility in D.C.

=== Later years in D.C. ===
In the late 1970s, Nirenska's husband, Jan Karski, proposed that the couple build a new home. Karski insisted that it contain a private dance studio for his wife. Completion of the studio reignited her interest in modern dance and led to her coming out of retirement.

In 1977, Nirenska sought out dancer Liz Lerman, then teaching a rudimentary dance class for senior citizens at a local residential hotel. Her reasons for doing so remain unclear. Nirenska set an older solo piece "The Eternal Insomnia of the Earth" on Lerman. Shortly after, creative differences led to a break between Nirenska and Lerman. Lerman suggested that Nirenska seek out local dancer Jan Tievsky, who had recently founded Glen Echo Dance Theater in Glen Echo, Maryland. Nirenska initially remounted (and, on occasion, reworked) older dances for the troupe. She also created new works for members of the company and guest artists. The first of these, a modified version of Nirenska's 1965 work Three Sculptures, debuted in August 1980. Four months later, Glen Echo Dance Theater announced the appointment of Nirenska as a resident choreographer. Glen Echo Dance Theater presented the world premiere of her The Divided Self (with Jan Tievsky and Cheryl Koehler) at the City Dance '81 dance festival in April 1981. It was her first new work in 13 years. A new group piece, Dirge, debuted in June 1981 at Glen Echo as well.

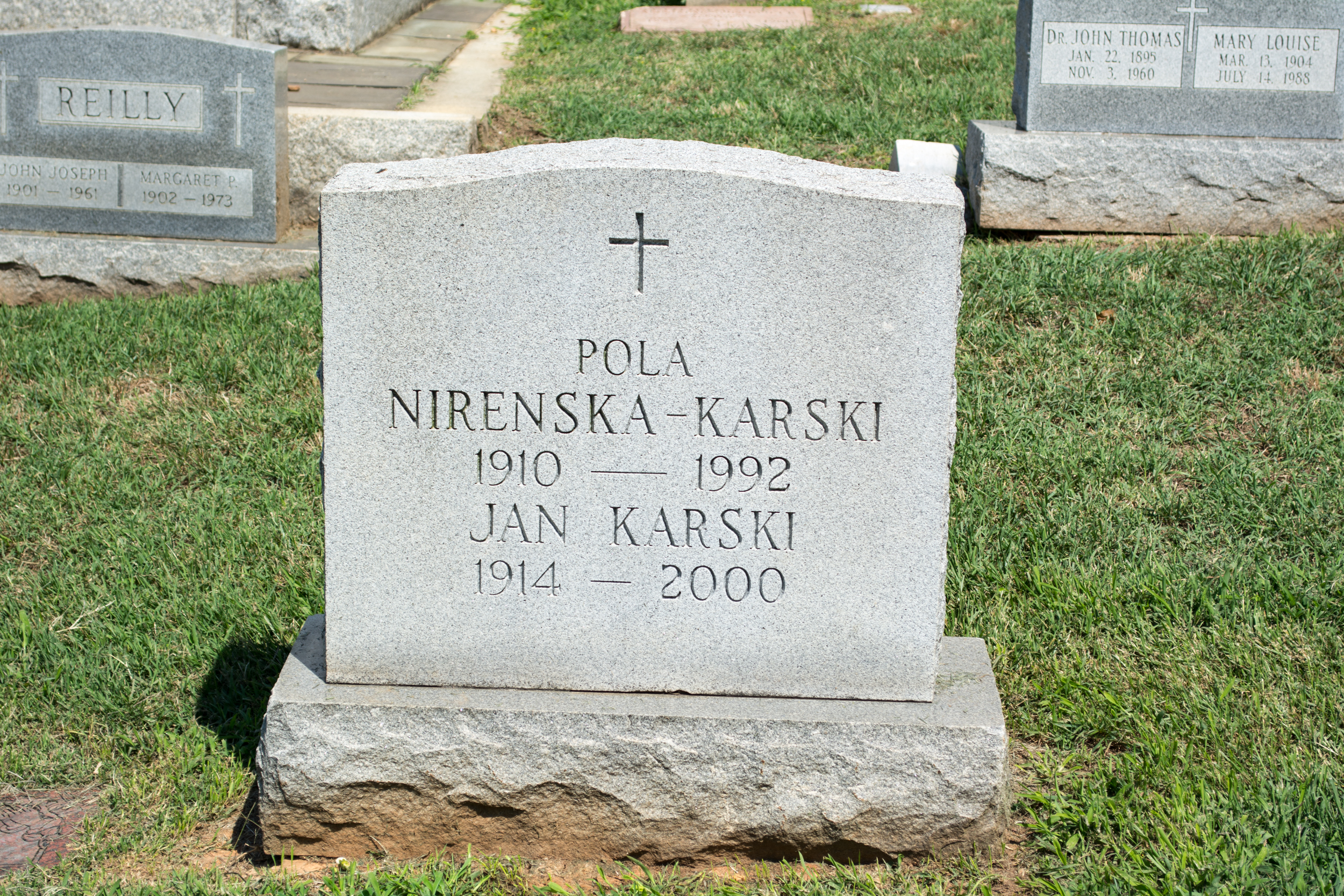
Grave of Pola Nirenska and her husband, Jan Karski, at Mount Olivet Cemetery in Washington, D.C.

Nirenska had a major concert of her work was presented on March 9, 1982, at the Marvin Theater at George Washington University. The concert was produced by Jan Tievsky and featured dancers from Glen Echo Dance Theater, in addition to guest artists. The program featured both old and new works. Virtually the entire modern dance community of the D.C. area was present. Soon afterward, Nirenska left Glen Echo Dance Theater to focus on creating new work and began choreographing and rehearsing dancers in her home studio. Nirenska composed a number of new works over the next several years. These included four solo pieces in February 1983; a satirical group piece, The Tired Magician, in March 1984 in which she herself appeared, seated; a new work, Trapped, set to music by Philip Glass, in December 1985; a solo piece, Exuberance, in 1986 choreographed specifically for dancer Laura Schandelmeir; Woman, a trilogy of linked solos, and the solo work Shout, in June 1987; and Out of Sorts, which debuted at the Terrace Theater at the John F. Kennedy Center for the Performing Arts in February 1988. As art critic Pamela Sommers said, these new compositions were "a powerful collection...concerning war, memory, desire and death."

Throughout the 1980s, Nirenska was at work on a major piece, In Memory of Those I Loved...Who Are No More (known as the "Holocaust Tetralogy"). Jan Karski had testified before Congress in 1980 to promote federal funding for the United States Holocaust Memorial Museum. Karski was also interviewed in his home for the documentary film Shoah. This sparked a flood of memories for Nirenska, which she began to turn into dance compositions. She began work on the final piece in the tetralogy, The Train, in 1988. Her intention was to complete it and have it performed at the Kennedy Center's Terrace Theatre before the end of the year. The stress of revisiting memories of the loss of her family proved too much, and Nirenska had a severe nervous breakdown and extended paranoid episode. Karski told dancers, then in rehearsal, that Nirenska had fallen ill, and the concert was cancelled. About 18 months passed before Nirenska had recovered enough to finish The Train and complete rehearsals for the tetralogy.

In July 1990, Pola Nirenska gave a "farewell concert" in which her In Memory of Those I Loved...Who Are No More debuted in its final form. A new solo piece, composed for dancer Rima Faber, also made its debut. The concert, "An Evening of Choreography", was held on Nirenska's 80th birthday at Dance Place, at dance studio located at 3225 8th Street NE in Washington. The "Holocaust Tetralogy" consisted of three group and one solo dance depicting the emotions Nirenska felt as a refugee who lost almost her entire family in the Holocaust. Critic Anna Kisselgoff, writing for The New York Times, called the tetralogy "compelling".

The "Holocaust Tetralogy" was last performance of Nirenska's work before her death.

=== Death ===
Nirenska committed suicide on 25 July 1992 by leaping from the 11th-floor balcony of her home in Bethesda, Maryland. She was interred at Mount Olivet Cemetery in Washington, D.C.

== Personal life ==
Nirenska married John Justinian de Ledesma (aka "John Justin") in 1946. They divorced in 1949.

She married Jan Karski in 1965. Karski first saw (but did not meet) Nirenska when she danced at the Polish government-in-exile's embassy in London in World War II. He saw her again on stage during her Washington debut in May 1953. He later sent her a fan letter. He then met her at a party in Washington, and asked her to dinner. She thought it more proper for them to have lunch. Nirenska knew little of Karski's war-time work. They spoke English to one another; this was the language Nirenska preferred, and Karski believed she had left Poland at a young age and no longer remembered the language. Only when they were engaged was he surprised to learn she spoke fluent Polish. During their life together, they never spoke of the Holocaust or the war. Nirenska never read Karski's book, Story of a Secret State. Karski never watched her develop In Memory of Those I Loved...Who Are No More, and Nirenska was reluctant to let him see it. When it had its world premiere, Karski had to buy a ticket to see the performance. The couple had no children. Karski died in July 2000.

== Performing technique and choreographic style ==
Nirenska said her mentors included Doris Humphrey, Kurt Jooss, Charles Weidman, and Mary Wigman.

Nirenska's early performance style was heavily rooted in the German Expressionist dance style of Mary Wigman and others. This style of dance emphasized the truthful expression of emotion. Where ballet emphasized beauty to the exclusion of all else, Expressionist dance demanded that ugliness be integrated into dance for truth and emotion to be expressed. Techniques in Expressionist dance included an emphasis on dynamism, the exploration of space, tension, the weight of the body, and contact with the ground. Nirenska's Expressionism utilized muscle tension, stark movement, circling, locomotive scales, spinning, and vibration. Loose or released muscles were not part of her Expressionist techniques. In composition, Nirenska's Expressionism was highly dramatic, and often used "sculptural" masses of performers in group dances.

After 1951, Nirenska's work expressed both German Expressionism and post-war American identity-based modern dance. She embraced the humanistic tradition of Humphrey and Weidman, and continued to express raw emotion in her work even as she introduced warmer, more compassionate emotion and even extreme tenderness into her performances. She introduced lyricism into her work, infusing it with compassion and refusing to allow it to mask the truth she sought to convey. Her retention of Expressionism, critic Alan M. Kriegsman said, was not mere conservatism. Rather, it was because Nirenska was convinced it had meaning and that it allowed her to best express her own feelings. She required an even higher level of craft from herself and her performers. Her technique now incorporated fall-and-recovery, opposition-and-succession, more urgent movement, clarity of gesture, and strength.

Compositionally, her work also shifted after 1951. Her work was more conceptually and structurally clear. Her works retained an emphasis on depicting basic emotion, but she also began to address social issues. Her choreography was increasingly guided by three elements: Truthfulness, the depiction of emotion, and references to her flight from Nazism and the loss of her family. While she continued to mass performers, she often broke masses up into individuals rather than moving them in space. She also adopted a thematic device where sequences of movement were repeated with different levels of energy. She became particularly skilled at composing pithy, intense solos.

== Legacy ==
Dance historian Susan Manning has argued that Pola Nirenska made important contributions to American dance. Dancers like Chladek, Jooss, Leeder, van Laban, and Wigman made just as many contributions, but they did so at a time when American modern dance was still in its infancy. Thus, the impact of their contributions reverberated through the American dance community. By the time Nirenska came to America, her contributions were less felt because American modern dance had become more mature and confident.

Nirenska was a major force in the modern dance community in Washington, D.C. She was a leader in choreography, direction, performance, and teaching. The Library of Congress considers her contributions to dance pedagogy notable for her stress on aesthetics, art history, composition, dance history, drama, drawing, Labanotation, and music history. She believed that every dancer should be able to read music and play an instrument. She was well-known, said critic Alan Kriegsman, as one of the most creative people in the city. At the time of her death, she was considered the "grand matriarch of modern dance" in the city, and she left behind a legacy that has "few parallels in the annals of Washington art."

=== Prizes named for Nirenska ===
In 1992, shortly after Nirenska's death, Jan Karski established the Jan Karski and Pola Nirenska Award. Administered by the YIVO Institute for Jewish Research, the $5,000 prize is given to an author or authors whose published work documents or interprets Jewish contributions to Polish culture and science.

In 1994, Karski also established the Pola Nirenska Award for Outstanding Contribution to Dance. Administered by the Washington Performing Arts Society, this $5,000 prize is given to an individual (usually from the D.C. area) who has made outstanding contributions to dance. A second award, the Nirenska Memorial Award for Lifetime Achievement, was established about 2009.

== Bibliography ==
- Anderson, Jack (1987). The American Dance Festival. Durham, N.C.: Duke University Press. ISBN 9780822306832.
- Bourne, Stephen (2005). Elisabeth Welch: Soft Lights and Sweet Music. Lanham, Md.: Scarecrow Press. ISBN 9780810854130.
- Brandstetter, Gabriele; Polzer, Elena (2015). Poetics of Dance: Body, Image, and Space in the Historical Avant-Gardes. New York: Oxford University Press. ISBN 9780199916559.
- Donaldson, Frances Lonsdale (1988). The Royal Opera House in the Twentieth Century. London: Weidenfeld and Nicolson. ISBN 9780297791782.
- Evans, Richard J. (2003). The Coming of the Third Reich. New York: Penguin Group. ISBN 9780143034698.
- Fuhrer, Margaret (2014). American Dance: The Complete Illustrated History. Minneapolis: Voyageur Press. ISBN 9780760345993.
- Gitelman, Claudia, ed. (2003). Liebe Hanya: Mary Wigman's letters to Hanya Holm. Madison, Wisc.: University of Wisconsin Press. ISBN 9780299190743.
- Hausler, Barbara (1998). "In the Long Line: The Teaching Work of Nona Schurman". Choreography and Dance. ISBN 9789057550300.
- Kant, Marion (2011). "Death and the Maiden: Mary Wigman in the Weimar Republic". In Kolb, Alexandra (ed.). Dance and Politics. New York: P. Lang. ISBN 9783039118489.
- Karina, Lillian; Kant, Marion (2004). Hitler's Dancers: German Modern Dance and the Third Reich. New York: Berghahn. ISBN 9781571813008.
- Kassing, Gayle (2007). History of Dance: An Interactive Arts Approach. Champaign, Ill.: Human Kinetics. ISBN 9780736060356.
- Kassing, Gayle (2014). Discovering Dance. Champaign, Ill.: Human Kinetics. ISBN 9781450468862.
- Kolb, Alexandra (2011). "About This Book". In Kolb, Alexandra (ed.). Dance and Politics. New York: P. Lang. ISBN 9783039118489.
- London, John (2000). "Introduction". In London, John (ed.). Theatre Under the Nazis. New York: Manchester University Press. ISBN 9780719059124.
- Lyman, David (Winter 1987). "An Old World Modernist Working in the Present". Washington DanceView: 5–9.
- Manning, Susan (2004). Modern Dance, Negro Dance: Race in Motion. Minneapolis: University of Minnesota Press. ISBN 9780816637362.
- Manning, Susan (2006). Ecstasy and the Demon: The Dances of Mary Wigman. Minneapolis: University of Minnesota Press. ISBN 9780816638024.
- Manning, Susan (2007). "Ausdruckstanz Across the Atlantic". In Franco, Susanne; Nordera, Marina (eds.). Dance Discourses: Keywords in Dance Research. New York: Routledge. ISBN 9780415423083.
- Mantle, Burns; Chapman, John Arthur; Sherwood, Garrison P.; Kronenberger, Louis (1950). The Burns Mantle Best Plays of 1949–1950 and the Year Book of the Drama in America. New York: Dodd, Mead.
- Mozingo, Karen (2008). Crossing the Borders of German and American Modernism: Exile and Transnationalism in the Dance Works of Valeska Gert, Lotte Goslar, and Pola Nirenska (MA). Ohio State University.
- Partsch-Bergsohn, Isa (1994). Modern Dance in Germany and the United States: Crosscurrents and Influences. Chur, Switzerland: Harwood Academic Publishers. ISBN 9783718655571.
- Perriman, Wendy K. (2009). Willa Cather and the Dance: "A most satisfying elegance". Madison, Wisc.: Fairleigh Dickinson University Press. ISBN 9780838642030.
- Randall, Tresa (2012). "Hanya Holm and an American Tanzgemeinschaft". In Manning, Susan (ed.). New German Dance Studies. Urbana, Ill.: University of Illinois Press. ISBN 9780252036767.
- Shirer, William L. (1960). The Rise and Fall of the Third Reich. New York: Simon & Schuster. ISBN 9780671624200.
- Sorrell, Walter (1967). The Dance Through the Ages. New York: Grosset & Dunlap.
- Waring, J.P. (2014). The London Stage 1930–1939: A Calendar of Productions, Performers, and Personnel. Lanham, Md.: Rowman and Littlefield. ISBN 9780810893030.
