= Jerzy Lerski =

Polish lawyer and historian

Jerzy Jan Lerski
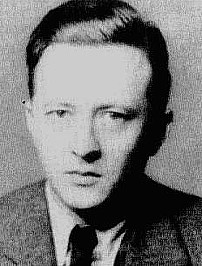
- Jerzy Lerski, 1944
- Born: 1917; Lviv
- Died: 1992 (aged 74–75); San Francisco
- Education: Lwów University, Georgetown University
- Occupations: lawyer, soldier, historian, political scientist, politician
- Employer: University of San Francisco
- Honours: Righteous Among the Nations, Officer's Cross of the Order of Polonia Restituta

Jerzy Jan Lerski (nom de guerre: Jur; also known as George Jan Lerski; 1917–1992) was a Polish lawyer, soldier, historian, political scientist, and politician.

After World War II he emigrated to the United States, then taught in Japan, Pakistan, and Sri Lanka under the auspices of several C.I.A.-funded organizations, and in 1966 became a professor at the University of San Francisco.

== Life ==
Born 20 January 1917 in Lwów, Poland (now Lviv, Ukraine), Jerzy Lerski studied law at Lwów University. In interwar Poland he joined the Stronnictwo Demokratyczne (Polish Democratic Party); he became known for his strong opposition to antisemitic events.

Jerzy Lerski first saw action in World War II during the 1939 Polish September Campaign. He fought in the Battle of Brześć Litewski in the rank of officer cadet (podchorąży, ensign). Taken prisoner by the Soviet Army during the Soviet invasion, he managed to escape from a train transport. He joined the anti-Soviet resistance but, with the NKVD (the Soviet Secret Police) actively looking for him, he escaped via Hungary to France, joining the Polish Armed Forces in the West. After the fall of France on 25 June 1940, Lerski went to Great Britain.

In 1941 he became a member of the Silent Unseen (Polish: Cichociemni), an elite unit of special-operations paratroopers of the Polish Armed Forces in the West, created in Great Britain to operate in occupied Poland.

In February 1943 he parachuted into Poland, collected information from the Polish Secret State, and delivered the information to the Polish Government-in-Exile in London, England.

In November 1944 he was appointed secretary to Tomasz Arciszewski, the third Prime Minister of Poland in Exile (1944–1947). At a meeting between Arciszewski and the prime minister of the United Kingdom, Winston Churchill, Lerski gave a detailed report on the plight of the Jews in Poland.

When World War II ended in Europe, Lerski remained in London instead of returning to a Soviet-dominated Poland. He was active in the Polish political movement, Polski Ruch Wolnościowy Niepodległość i Demokracja.

On the eve of the Cold War, he emigrated to the United States and in 1953 obtained a Ph.D. in history from Georgetown University.

Under the aegis of several organizations funded by the Central Intelligence Agency as part of a U.S. program of countering communist influences, during most of 1954–1958 Lerski lectured in Japan; later, in Pakistan (1958–1960) and Sri Lanka (1962–1964). Between 1964 and 1966 he conducted research at Stanford University's Hoover Institution. In 1966 he received a tenured position at the University of San Francisco, effectively concluding his engagement with Asian studies.

At the University of San Francisco, he became a historian of East Central Europe. His courses at USF were on Modern European History.

In 1974 Lerski became president, for one year, of the Polish American Historical Association

He retired from the University of San Francisco in 1980, but continued lecturing at the Fromm Institute for Lifelong Learning at the University of San Francisco.

Lerski published books and articles on Polish history. In 1988 he published a memoir of his wartime experiences, Poland's Secret Envoy, 1939–1945.

He was a personal friend of Karol Józef Wojtyła, the later Pope John Paul II, and supported Solidarność (Solidarity) founder and activist Lech Wałęsa.

The State of Israel recognized him as a Righteous among the Nations, an honor accorded to non-Jews who risked their lives during the Holocaust to save Jews from extermination by Nazi Germany. The citation read: "Jerzy Jan Lerski ... informed political circles abroad about the extermination and persecution of Jews."

Jerzy Lerski died 16 September 1992 following coronary bypass surgery at the Veterans Hospital in San Francisco, California.

== Works ==
- Jerzy Lerski, The Economy of Poland Washington 1954, Council for Economic and Industry Research;
- Jerzy Lerski, A Polish Chapter in Jacksonian America:The United States and the Polish Exiles of 1831 ; Madison, University of Wisconsin Press, 1958
- Jerzy Lerski, Origins of Trotskyism in Ceylon; a documentary history of the Lanka Sama Samaja Party, 1935-1942. Stanford 1968, Hoover Institution on War, Revolution and Peace,
- Jerzy Lerski, Herbert Hoover and Poland : a documentary history of a friendship / compiled and with an introd. by George J. Lerski; foreword by U. S. Senator Mark O. Hatfield (R-OR). Stanford 1977: Hoover Institution Press, ISBN 0-8179-6741-9
- Jerzy Lerski, Jewish-Polish coexistence, 1772-1939 : a topical bibliography / compiled by George J. Lerski and Halina T. Lerski; foreword by Lucjan Dobroszycki. New York 1986, Greenwood Press, ISBN 0-313-24758-7
- Jerzy Lerski, Poland's Secret Envoy, 1939–1945 (autobiography), New York 1988, Bicentennial Publishing, ISBN 0912757213
  - Jerzy Lerski, Emisariusz Jur (autobiography), Warszawa 1989, wyd. I krajowe, wyd OW "Interim" ISBN 83-85083-00-6, ISBN 83-7043-025-2
- Jerzy Lerski, Historical dictionary of Poland, 966-1945 / George J. Lerski; with special editing and emendations by Piotr Wróbel and Richard J. Kozicki; foreword by Aleksander Gieysztor. Westport 1996, Greenwood Press, ISBN 0-313-26007-9

== See also ==
- List of Poles

== Sources ==
- Marek Skurski, "Jerzy Lerski in Japan, 1954–1958: Cold War Mission of a Polish Political Exile", Polish American Studies, vol. LXXXII, no. 2 (Autumn 2025), pp. 81–110.
