= Jan Karski =

Polish World War II resistance movement fighter

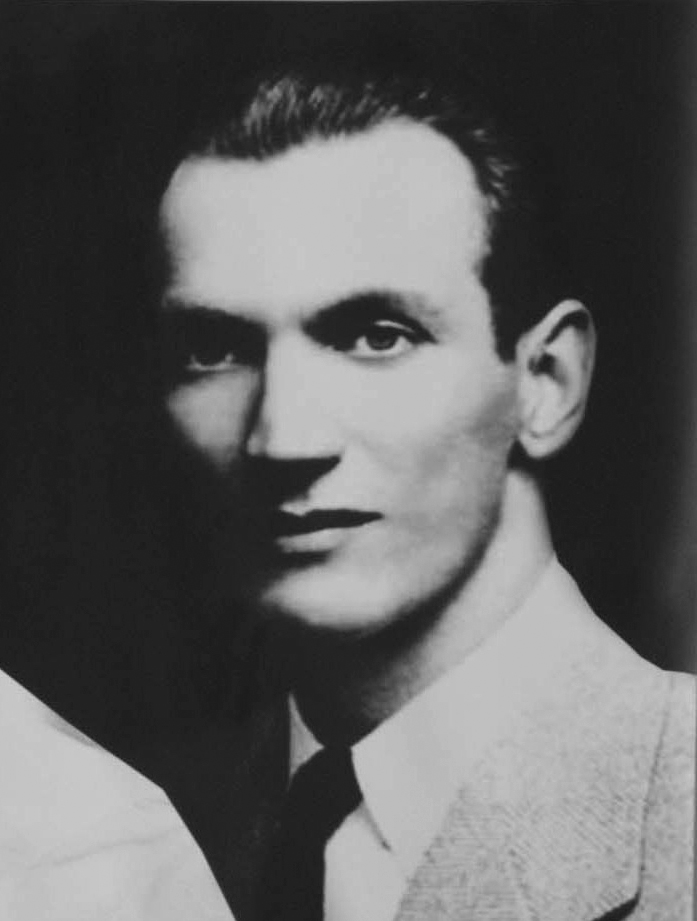
- Jan Karski photo portrait
- Born: Jan Kozielewski; 24 April 1914 (Note: Karski's date of birth is sometimes given as 24 April 1914, based on his baptismal records in Russian and subsequently shown on his official birth certificate. 24 June was confirmed by Karski's family lawyer, Dr. Wieslawa Kozielewska-Trzaska, by Karski's niece and god-daughter, and by the Jan Karski Society, an organization established shortly after his death to preserve his legacy. It is the date Karski himself used on handwritten documents, including several diplomatic dossiers at the League of Nations. 24 April was the birth date shown on both the diploma for Karski's master's degree (awarded in 1935) and his certificate from the Artillery Reserve Officer Cadet School (awarded in 1936). In March 2014, the United States Senate adopted a resolution honoring Karski on the centennial of his birth, 24 April 2014. The resolution was withdrawn and revised to recognize Karski on 24 June 2014, according to the Polish Press Agency. Karski's diplomatic passport showed his date of birth as 22 March 1912.); Łódź, Congress Poland, Russian Empire
- Died: 13 July 2000 (aged 86); Washington, D.C., U.S.
- Other names: Jan Kozielewski (birth name); Piasecki, Kwaśniewski, Znamierowski, Kruszewski, Kucharski, and Witold (akas)
- Occupations: Polish resistance fighter; diplomat; activist; professor; author
- Known for: World War II resistance and the Holocaust rescue
- Spouse: Pola Nireńska

Jan Karski (Polish: [ˈjan ˈkar.ski]; birthname: Jan Kozielewski, Polish: [ˈjan kɔ.ʑɛˈlɛf.ski]; 24 June 1914 – 13 July 2000) was a Polish soldier, resistance-fighter, and diplomat during World War II. He is known for having acted as a courier in 1940–1943 to the Polish government-in-exile and to Poland's Western Allies about the situation in German-occupied Poland. He reported about the state of Poland, its many competing resistance factions, and also about Germany's destruction of the Warsaw Ghetto and its operation of extermination camps on Polish soil that were murdering Jews, Poles, and others.

Emigrating to the United States after the war, Karski completed a doctorate and taught for decades at Georgetown University in international relations and Polish history. He lived in Washington, D.C., until the end of his life. Karski did not speak publicly about his wartime missions until 1981 when he was invited as a speaker to a conference on the liberation of the camps. Karski was featured in Claude Lanzmann's nine-hour film Shoah (1985), about the Holocaust, based on oral interviews with survivors, a historian, witnesses who lived near death camps, and several German officials involved in the destruction of European Jewry. After the fall of the Soviet Union, Karski was honored by the new Polish government, other European nations, and the US for his wartime role.

== Early life ==
Jan Karski was born Jan Romuald Kozielewski on 24 June 1914 in Łódź, Poland. Karski was born on St John's Day, and named Jan (the Polish equivalent of John), following the Polish custom of naming children after the saint(s) of their birthday. His baptismal record—in error—listed 24 April as his birthdate, as Karski explained later in interviews on several occasions (see Waldemar Piasecki's biography of Karski, One Life, as well as published interviews with his family).

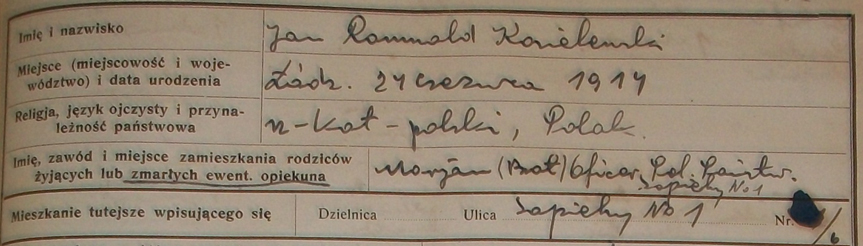
Jan Kozielewski's handwritten pre-WWII document showing birthdate from Lviv archives

Karski had two brothers and one sister. Among his sibling was Marian Kozielewski, a police inspector in Warsaw. The children were raised as Catholics and Karski remained a Catholic throughout his life. His father died when he was young, and the family struggled financially. Karski grew up in a multi-cultural neighborhood, where a majority of the populace was Jewish.

After military training at the school for mounted artillery officers in Włodzimierz Wołyński, he graduated with a First in the Class of 1936 and was ordered to the 5th Regiment of Mounted Artillery, the same unit where Colonel Józef Beck, later Poland's Foreign Affairs Minister, served.

Karski completed his diplomatic apprenticeship between 1935 and 1938 at various posts in Romania (twice), Germany, Switzerland, and the United Kingdom, and joined the diplomatic service. After completing and gaining a First in Grand Diplomatic Practice, on 1 January 1939 he started work in the Polish Ministry of Foreign Affairs.

== World War II ==
During the Polish September Campaign, Karski's 5th Regiment was part of the Kraków Cavalry Brigade, under General Zygmunt Piasecki, a unit of the Armia Kraków defending the area between Zabkowice and Częstochowa. After the Battle of Tomaszów Lubelski on 10 September 1939, some units, including Karski's 1st Battery, 5th Regiment, tried to reach Hungary but were captured by the Red Army between 17 and 20 September. Karski was held prisoner in the Kozielszczyna camp (presently in Ukraine). He successfully concealed his true rank of second lieutenant and, after a uniform exchange, was identified by the NKVD commander as a private. He was transferred to the Germans as a person born in Łódź, which was incorporated into the Third Reich, and thus escaped the Katyn massacre of Polish officers by the Soviets.

=== Resistance ===
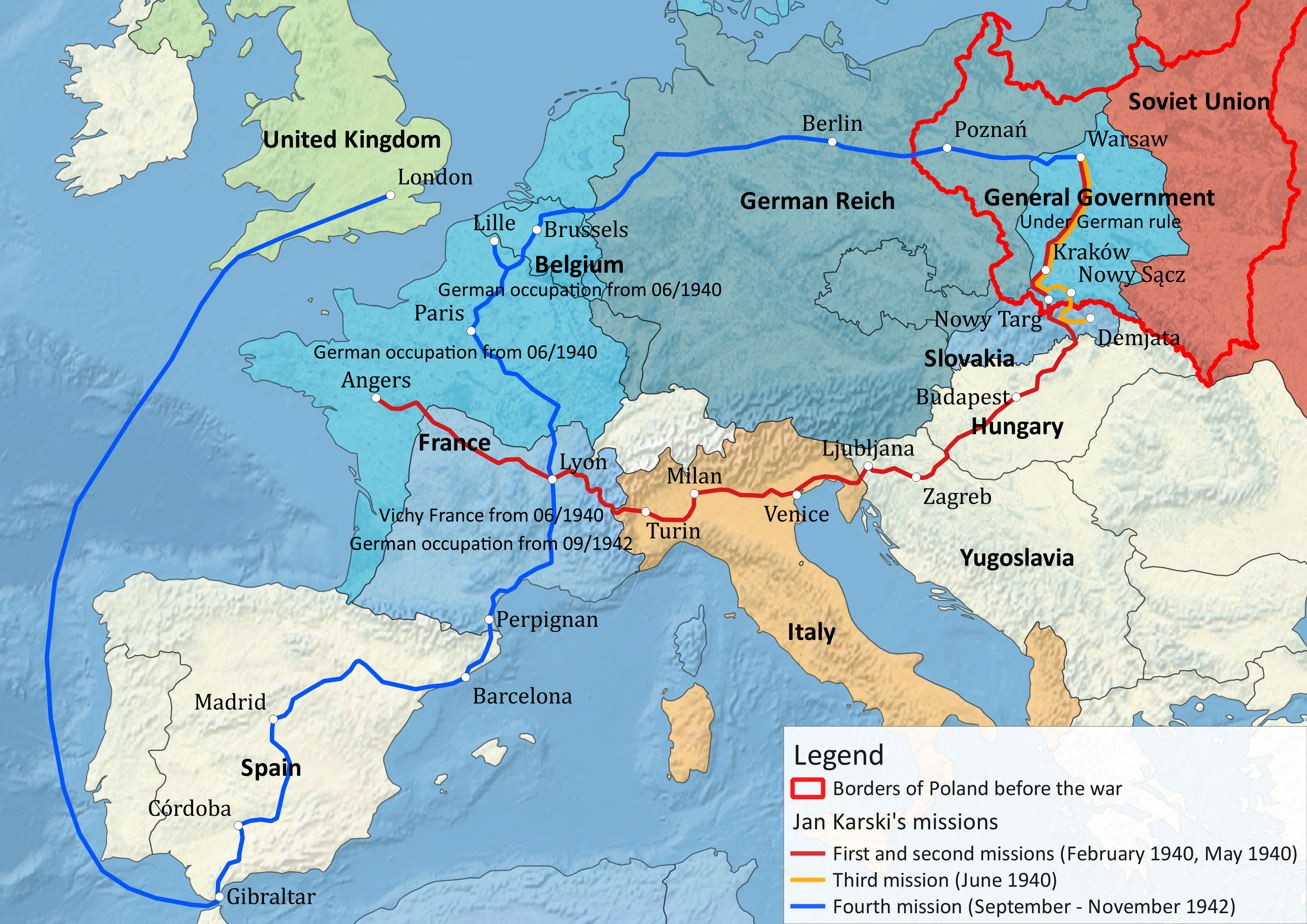
Jan Karski's missions

In November 1939 Karski was among POWs on a train bound for a POW camp in the General Government zone, a part of Poland that had not been fully incorporated into The Third Reich. He escaped and made his way to Warsaw. There he joined the SZP (Służba Zwycięstwu Polski)—the first resistance movement in occupied Europe, organized by General Michał Karaszewicz-Tokarzewski, the predecessor to ZWZ, later the Home Army (AK).

About that time Karski (until then, Kozielewski) adopted the nom de guerre, Jan Karski, which he later made his legal name. Other names used by him during World War II included Piasecki, Kwaśniewski, Znamierowski, Kruszewski, Kucharski, and Witold. In January 1940 Karski began to organize courier missions to transport dispatches from the Polish underground to the Polish government-in-exile, then based in Paris. As a courier, Karski made several secret trips between France, Britain, and Poland. During one such mission in July 1940, he was arrested by the Gestapo in the Tatra Mountains in Slovakia. Tortured, he was transported to a hospital in Nowy Sącz, from which he was smuggled out with the help of Józef Cyrankiewicz. After a short period of rehabilitation, he returned to active service in the Information and Propaganda Bureau of the headquarters of the Polish Home Army.

In 1942, Karski was selected by Cyryl Ratajski, the Polish Government Delegate's Office at Home, to undertake a secret mission to see prime minister Władysław Sikorski in London. Karski was to contact Sikorski and various other Polish politicians and brief them on Nazi atrocities in occupied Poland. In order to gather evidence, Karski met Bund activist Leon Feiner. He was twice smuggled by the Jewish underground into the Warsaw Ghetto in order to directly observe what was happening to Polish Jews.

My job was just to walk. And observe. And remember. The odour. The children. Dirty. Lying. I saw a man standing with blank eyes. I asked the guide: what is he doing? The guide whispered: “He’s just dying”. I remember degradation, starvation and dead bodies lying on the street. We were walking the streets and my guide kept repeating: “Look at it, remember, remember” And I did remember. The dirty streets. The stench. Everywhere. Suffocating. Nervousness.

Disguised as a Ukrainian camp guard (although in some of his writings Karski stated he was disguised as an Estonian guard, for security and political reasons) he also visited a Durchgangslager ('transit camp') for Bełżec death camp located in the town of Izbica Lubelska, midway between Lublin and Bełżec. While Karski accurately reported the location in his initial reports, written in 1943, in his book published in the USA during the war, Karski identified the camp as the Bełżec death camp, which has led to some confusion among historians. According to Thomas Wood and Stanislaw Jankowski, Karski was initially told he was going to be taken to see Bełżec and in his book, Karski was referring to the overall system of murder centered on Bełżec rather than the camp itself.

=== Reporting Nazi atrocities to the Western Allies ===
The Mass Extermination of Jews in German Occupied Poland, by the Polish government-in-exile, publicized the Raczyński's Note addressed to the wartime allies of the then-United Nations on 10 December 1942

Starting in 1940, Karski reported to the Polish, British, and US governments on the situation in Poland, especially on the destruction of the Warsaw Ghetto and the Nazi extermination of Polish Jews. He smuggled out of Poland microfilm from the underground resistance movement with further information on the extermination of European Jews in German-occupied Poland. His reports were transcribed and translated by Walentyna Stocker, the personal secretary and interpreter for Sikorski. Based on Karski's microfilm, Polish Foreign Minister Count Edward Raczyński provided the Allies with one of the earliest and most accurate accounts of the Nazi Holocaust. Raczyński's Note, which was addressed to the governments of the World War II allies on 10 December 1942, was later published along with other documents in a widely distributed leaflet entitled The Mass Extermination of Jews in German Occupied Poland.

Karski met with Polish politicians in exile including the prime minister, as well as members of political parties such as the Socialist Party, National Party, Labor Party, People's Party, Jewish Bund and Poalei Zion. He also spoke to the British Foreign Secretary Anthony Eden, giving a detailed account of what he had seen in Warsaw and Bełżec.

Karski also traveled to the United States, where, on 28 July 1943, he met with President Franklin D. Roosevelt in the Oval Office, the first eyewitness to tell Roosevelt of the situation in Poland and about the Jewish Holocaust. Roosevelt asked no questions about the Jews. in addition, Karski met with many other government and civic leaders in the United States, including Supreme Court Justice Felix Frankfurter, Secretary of State Cordell Hull, OSS head William J. Donovan, and Rabbi Stephen Wise. Karski also presented his report to news outlets, bishops of various religious denominations (including Cardinal Samuel Stritch), and members of the Hollywood film industry, many of whom were Jewish – but without notable result, as most of the people he spoke to could not comprehend the scale of extermination that he recounted. But Karski's accounts of the problems of stateless people and their vulnerability to murder helped inspire the formation of the War Refugee Board, changing US governmental policy from neutrality to support for war refugees and civilians in Europe, and after the war, inspiring the creation of the Office of High Commissioner for Refugees.

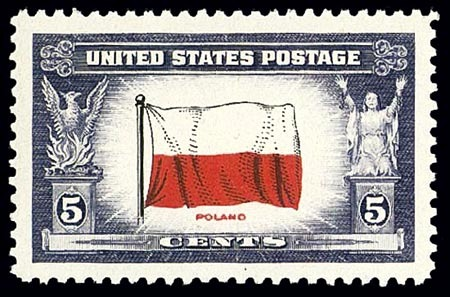
US stamp from 1943, a tribute to Polish Underground State

In 1944, Karski published Courier from Poland: The Story of a Secret State (a selection was featured in Collier's magazine six weeks before the book's publication).

According to Polish historian Adam Puławski, Karski's primary mission as a courier was to alert the Polish government-in-exile to the conflicts within the Polish underground movements. Puławski asserts that Karski discussed the Warsaw Ghetto liquidation as part of that account, almost incidentally. Without diminishing Karski's contributions, Puławski notes that facts about the Holocaust were available to the Allies for at least a year and a half before Karski met with Roosevelt, and asserts that claiming that his mission was primarily to report on the Holocaust is in error.

== Life in the United States ==
At the war's end, Karski remained in the United States in Washington, D.C. He began graduate studies at Georgetown University, receiving his Ph.D. in 1952. In 1954, Karski became a naturalized citizen of the United States.

Karski taught Eastern European affairs, comparative government, and international affairs at Georgetown University for 40 years. In 1985, he published the academic study The Great Powers and Poland, based on research during a Fulbright fellowship in 1974 to his native Poland.

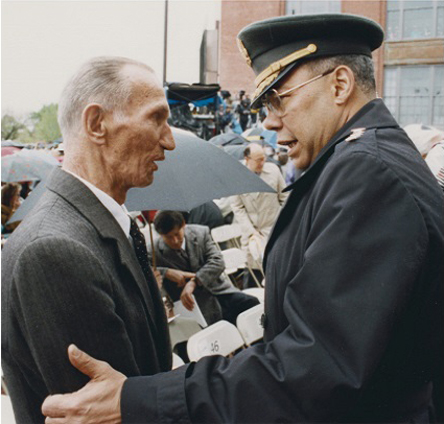
Jan Karski with General Colin Powell at the 1993 opening of the United States Holocaust Memorial Museum.

Karski's 1942 report on the Holocaust and the London Polish government's appeal to the United Nations were briefly recounted by Walter Laqueur in his history The Terrible Secret: Suppression of the Truth about Hitler's Final Solution (1980).

Karski did not speak publicly about his wartime mission until 1981 when he was invited by activist Elie Wiesel to serve as keynote speaker at the International Liberators Conference in Washington, D.C.

French filmmaker Claude Lanzmann interviewed Karski at length in 1978, as part of his preparation for his documentary Shoah, but the film was not released until 1985. Lanzmann had asked participants not to make other public statements during that time, but Karski got a release for the conference. The nine-and-a-half hour film included a total of 40 minutes of testimony by Karski, an excerpt from the first of two days of Lanzmann interviewing Karski. It ends with Karski saying that he made his report to leaders. Lanzman later said that, on the second day of interviews, Karski recounted in detail his meetings with Roosevelt and other high US officials. Lanzman said that the tone and style of Karski's second interview were so different, and the interview so long, that it did not fit with his vision of the film and was thus not used. Unhappy with how he was presented in the film, Karski published an article, later a book, Shoah, a Biased Vision of the Holocaust (1987), in the French journal Kultura. He argued for another documentary to include his missing testimony and also to show more of the help given to Jews by many Poles (some are now recognized by Israel as the Polish Righteous among the Nations).

Following the fall of communism in Poland in 1989, Karski's wartime role was officially acknowledged by the new government. He was awarded the Order of the White Eagle, the highest Polish civil decoration, and the Order Virtuti Militari, the highest military decoration awarded for bravery in combat.

In 1994, E. Thomas Wood and Stanisław M. Jankowski published a biography, Karski: How One Man Tried to Stop the Holocaust. They noted that Karski had urged the production of another documentary to correct what he thought was the bias in Lanzmann's Shoah.

During an interview with Hannah Rosen in 1995, Karski discussed the Allies' failure to rescue most of the Jews from mass murder:

It was easy for the Nazis to kill Jews, because they did it. The Allies considered it impossible and too costly to rescue the Jews, because they didn't do it. The Jews were abandoned by all governments, church hierarchies and societies, but thousands of Jews survived because thousands of individuals in Poland, France, Belgium, Denmark, Holland helped to save Jews. Now, every government and church says, "We tried to help the Jews", because they are ashamed, they want to keep their reputations. They didn't help, because six million Jews perished, but those in the government, in the churches they survived. No one did enough.

The documentary film My Mission (1997), directed by Waldemar Piasecki and Michal Fajbusiewicz, presented the full details of Karski's wartime mission. In 1999, Piasecki published Tajne Panstwo (Secret State, edited and adapted from Karski's wartime book), which became a bestseller. In the same year, the Museum of the City of Łódź opened "Jan Karski's Room", displaying memorabilia, documents, and decorations, all organized under Karski's supervision.

== After Karski's death ==
In 2010, French author Yannick Haenel published a novel Jan Karski, drawn from the courier's World War II activities and memoir. Haenel also added a third part in which he inserted his own views into Karski's "character", particularly in his approach to Karski's meeting with President Roosevelt and other US leaders. Claude Lanzmann criticized the author strongly and argued that Haenel ignored important historic elements of the time. Haenel said that was part of his freedom in fiction.

In response, Lanzmann released the second half of his interview with Karski as a 49-minute documentary in 2010, edited and entitled The Karski Report, also on ARTE. It is mostly about Karski's meeting with President Roosevelt and other American leaders.

Karski's wartime book was re-published posthumously by Georgetown University Press as My Report to the World: The Story of a Secret State (2013). A Tribute to Jan Karski panel discussion was held at the university that year in conjunction with the book's release. It featured a discussion of Karski's legacy by School of Foreign Service Dean Carol Lancaster, Georgetown University Board Chair Paul Tagliabue, former Secretary of State Madeleine Albright, former National Security Advisor Zbigniew Brzezinski, Polish Ambassador Ryszard Schnepf, and Rabbi Harold S. White.

== Personal life ==
Karski had several siblings, mostly brothers: Marian, Boguslaw, Cyjrian, Edmund, Stefan, and Uzef and a sister Laura.

Karski's eldest brother, Marian Kozielewski (b. 1898), reached the rank of colonel in the military and was also considered a hero in World War II. He had been arrested by the Germans in Warsaw in 1940 and was among Catholic Poles who survived being imprisoned as political prisoners at Auschwitz concentration camp. After being released in 1941, he returned to Warsaw and joined the resistance. The Kozielewski brothers admired Jozef Pilsudski and members of the "forgotten army", who had suffered many deeply personal wounds. After the war, Marian emigrated initially to Canada, where he married. He struggled as a refugee, holding low-level jobs after settling in Washington, D.C., in 1960 near his brother Jan. Marian Kozielewski committed suicide there in 1964 and is buried at Mount Olivet Cemetery.

In 1965, Karski married Pola Nireńska, a 54-year-old Polish Jew who was a dancer and choreographer. With the exception of her parents, who had emigrated to Israel in 1939 shortly before the Nazi invasion of Poland, all of her family had been murdered in the Holocaust. She committed suicide in 1992.

Karski died of unspecified heart and kidney disease in Washington, D.C., in 2000. He died at Georgetown University Hospital. He was interred at Mount Olivet Cemetery in Washington, next to the graves of his wife, Pola Nirenska, and brother Marian. He and Pola had no children.

== Honors and legacy ==
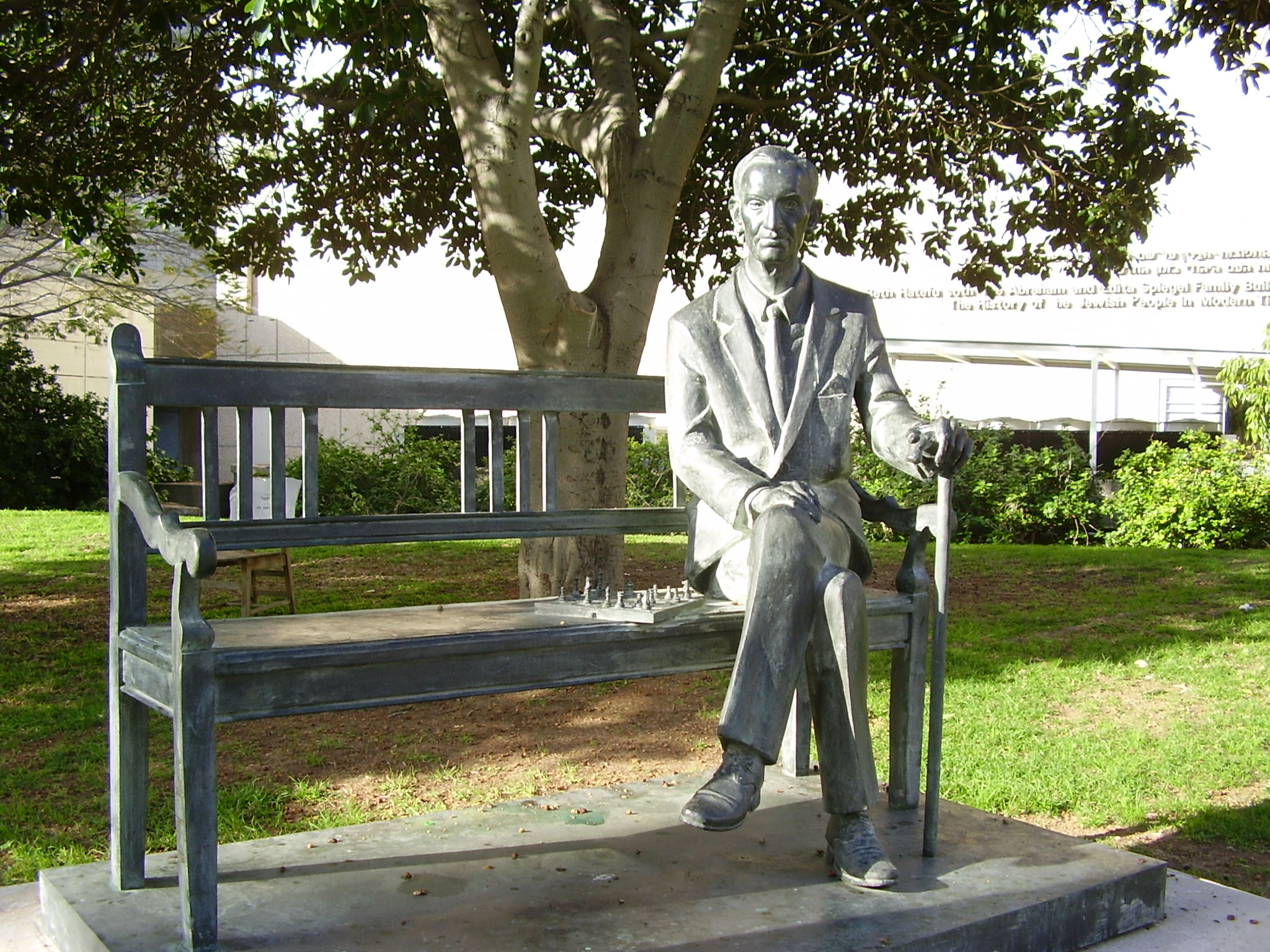
Jan Karski Statue in Tel Aviv University

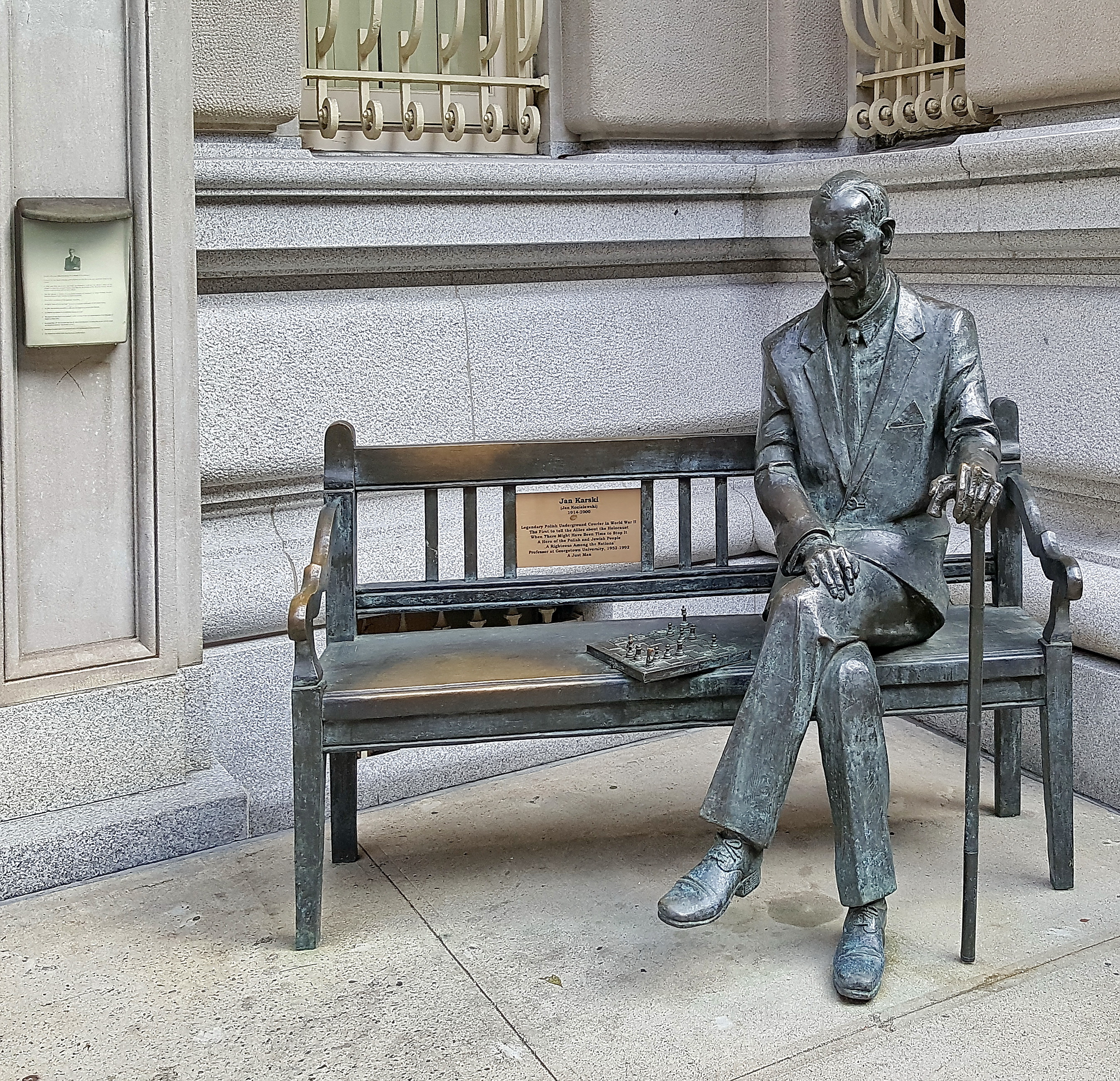
Jan Karski's Bench in front of the Consulate General of the Republic of Poland in New York City

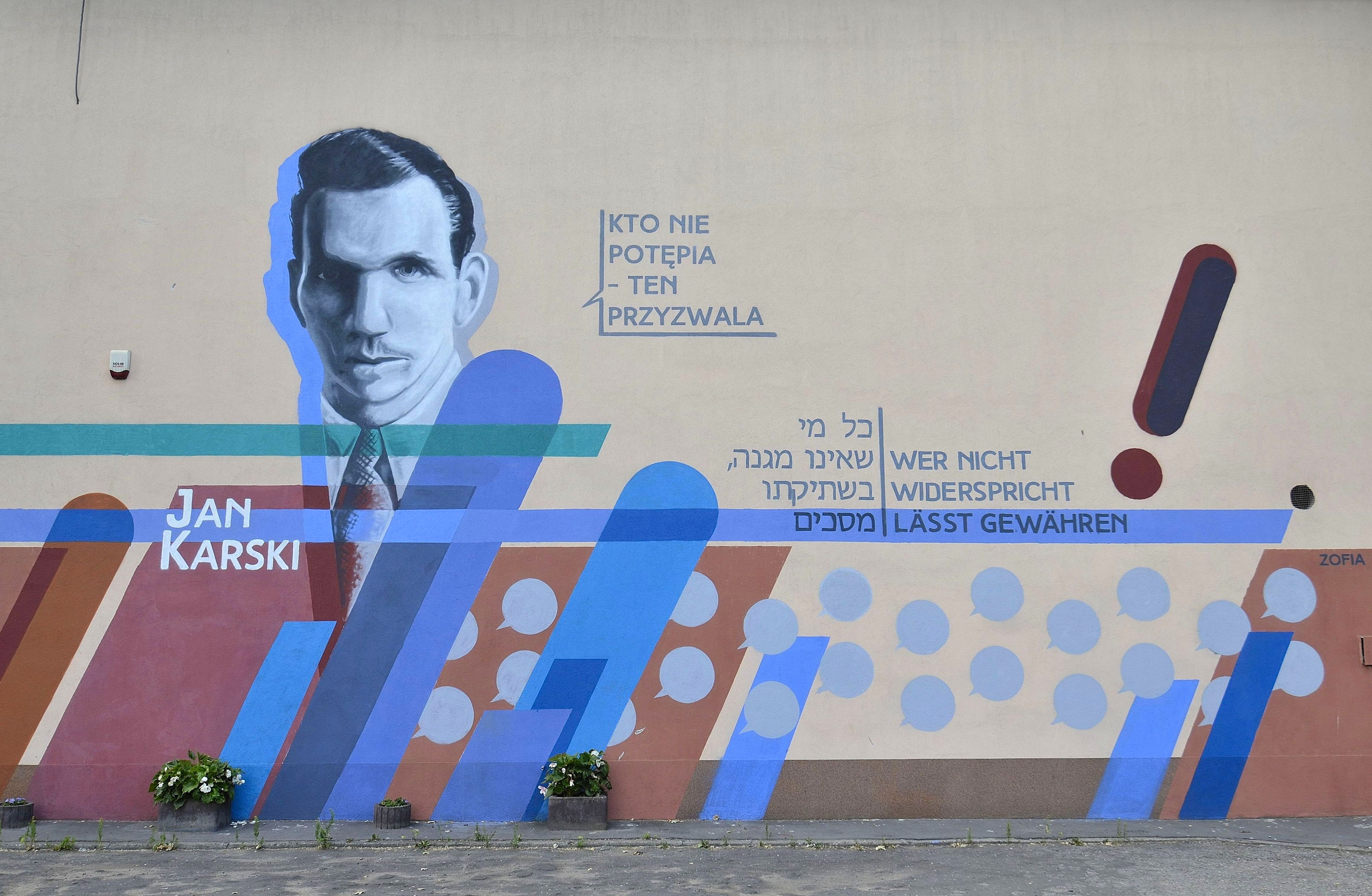
A mural He who does not condemn, acquiesces commemorating Karski at 30/32 Lubelska Street in Warsaw.

On 2 June 1982, Yad Vashem recognised Jan Karski as Righteous Among the Nations. A tree bearing a memorial plaque in his name was planted that same year at Yad Vashem's Avenue of the Righteous Among the Nations in Jerusalem.

In 1991, Karski was awarded the Wallenberg Medal of the University of Michigan. Statues honoring Karski have been placed in New York City at the corner of 37th Street and Madison Avenue (renamed as "Jan Karski Corner") and on the grounds of Georgetown University in Washington, DC. Additional benches, which were made by the Kraków-based sculptor Karol Badyna, are located in Kielce, Łódź, and Warsaw in Poland, and on the campus of Tel Aviv University in Israel. The talking Karski bench in Warsaw near the Museum of the History of Polish Jews has a button to activate a short talk by Karski about the war. Georgetown University, Oregon State University, Baltimore Hebrew College, Warsaw University, Maria Curie-Skłodowska University, and the University of Łódź all awarded Karski honorary doctorates.

In 1994, Karski was made an honorary citizen of Israel in honor of his efforts on behalf of Polish Jews during the Holocaust. Karski was nominated for the Nobel Prize and formally recognized by the UN General Assembly shortly before his death.

Shortly after his death, the Jan Karski Society was established, initiated by his close friend, collaborator and biographer, Professor Waldemar Piasecki. The society preserves his legacy and administers the Jan Karski Eagle Award, which he established in 2000. The list of laureates includes: Elie Wiesel, Shimon Peres, Lech Wałęsa, Aleksander Kwaśniewski, Tadeusz Mazowiecki, Bronisław Geremek, Jacek Kuroń, Adam Michnik, Karol Modzelewski, Oriana Fallaci, Dagoberto Valdés Hernández, Stanisław Dziwisz, Tygodnik Powszechny magazine, the Hoover Institution, and the United States Holocaust Memorial Museum.

After Karski's death, his estate was involved in a legal dispute with YIVO over a legacy gift that Karski made. The Maryland Court of Appeals (now known as the Supreme Court of Maryland) settled the dispute.

In April 2011, the Jan Karski US Centennial Campaign was created to increase interest in the life and legacy of the late Polish diplomat, as the centennial year of his birth in 2014 approached. In November 2012, having met its major goals, the Jan Karski US Centennial Campaign was succeeded by the Jan Karski Educational Foundation, which continues to promote Karski's legacy and values. The president of the foundation is Polish-American author Wanda Urbanska. The foundation sponsored three major conferences about Karski in his centennial birth year, at Georgetown University in Washington, at Loyola University in Chicago, and in Warsaw.

The campaign group was seeking to obtain the Presidential Medal of Freedom for Karski in advance of his anniversary. In addition, they wanted to promote educational activities, including workshops, artistic performances, and a reprint of his 1944 book, Story of a Secret State. In December 2011, the support of 68 US Representatives and 12 US Senators was obtained and a supporting nomination for the medal was submitted to the White House. On 23 April 2012, US President Barack Obama announced that Karski would receive the country's highest civilian honor, the Presidential Medal of Freedom. The medal was awarded posthumously by President Obama on 29 May 2012 and presented to Adam Daniel Rotfeld, the former Foreign Minister of Poland and himself a Jewish Holocaust survivor. Jan Karski's family was not invited to the presentation ceremony, which they strongly protested. The medal, along with other honors given to Karski, is on display at the "Karski office" in Łódź Museum. This is in accordance with the wishes of his surviving family, led by his niece and goddaughter Dr. Kozielewska-Trzaska.

A controversy erupted when a misspoken word in Barack Obama's Presidential Medal of Freedom speech came to be known as Gafa Obamy or 'Obama's gaffe', when the president referred to "a Polish death camp" instead of "a death camp in Poland" when talking of the Nazi German transit death camp that Karski had visited. "Polish death camps" is a term often used to refer to Nazi concentration camps in Poland, as opposed to (as may be implied) Polish concentration camps. The terms "Polish death camp" or "Polish concentration camp" reportedly originated with ex-Nazis working for the West German secret services. Historian Leszek Pietrzak explains the propaganda strategies from the 1950s. President Obama later characterized his term as a misstatement and his characterization was accepted by Polish President Bronisław Komorowski.

In early February 2014, the Jan Karski Society and the Karski family appealed to President of Poland Bronisław Komorowski to posthumously promote Jan Karski to the rank of brigadier general in recognition of his contribution to the war effort as well as all couriers and emissaries of the underground Polish state. The appeal received no response for a year. Member of the Polish parliament Professor Tadeusz Iwiński recently openly criticized the president of Poland for inaction on Karski's behalf.

On 24 June 2014, the "Jan Karski Mission Accomplished" Conference took place in Lublin under the patronage of Professor Elie Wiesel, Nobel Peace Prize Laureate, Aleksander Kwaśniewski, President of Poland (1995–2005), Moshe Kantor, President of the European Jewish Congress, and Michael Schudrich, Chief Rabbi of Poland.

In November 2018, a new street connecting the South Bay Mall to the Polish Triangle neighborhood of Dorchester, Boston in Massachusetts was named Jan Karski Way after consulting with the Polish-American Club of Boston.

== Remembrance ==
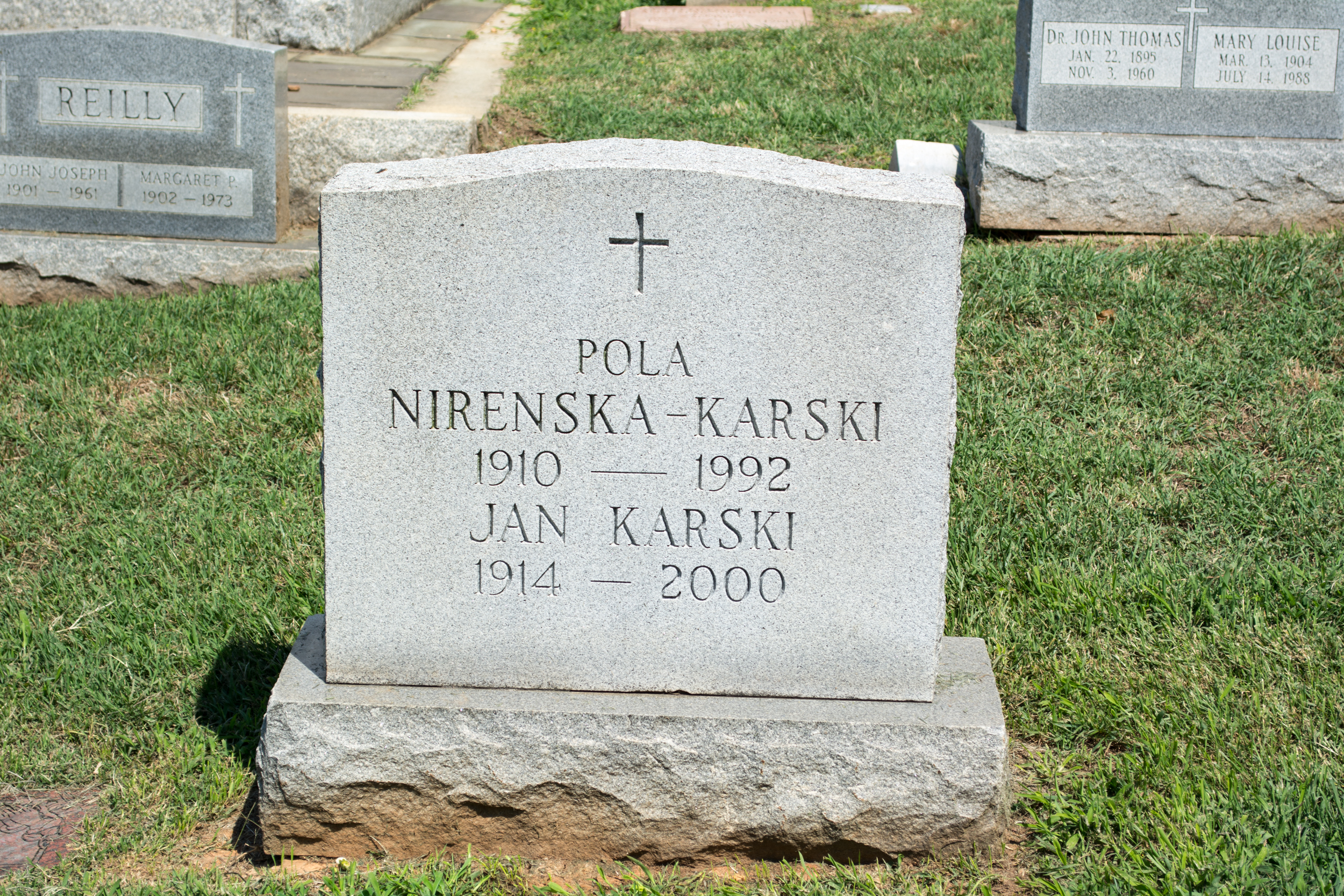
Grave of Jan Karski and Pola Nirenska at Mount Olivet Cemetery in Washington, D.C.

Former Foreign Minister of Poland Władysław Bartoszewski, in his speech at the ceremony of the 60th anniversary of the liberation of the concentration camp at Auschwitz-Birkenau, 27 January 2005, said: "The Polish resistance movement kept informing and alerting the free world to the situation. In the last quarter of 1942, thanks to the Polish emissary Jan Karski and his mission, and also by other means, the Governments of the United Kingdom and of the United States were well informed about what was going on in Auschwitz-Birkenau."

A full-length play on Karski's life and mission, Coming to See Aunt Sophie (2014), written by Arthur Feinsod, was produced in Germany and Poland. An English translation was produced in Bloomington, Indiana at the Jewish Theatre in June 2015, and in Australia in August of that year.

A new play, My Report to the World, written by Clark Young and Derek Goldman, premiered at Georgetown University during the conference honoring Karski's centennial year. It starred Oscar-nominated actor David Strathairn as Karski. It was performed in Warsaw before being produced in New York in July 2015; Strathairn played the Karski role in all productions. Goldman directed the play in both Washington DC and New York. The July performances were presented in partnership with The Museum of Jewish Heritage, The Laboratory for Global Performance and Politics at Georgetown University, Bisno Productions, and the Jan Karski Educational Foundation.

== Awards and decorations ==
- Order of the White Eagle
- Silver Cross of the Virtuti Militari, twice
- Home Army Cross
- Presidential Medal of Freedom (United States)

== Works ==
=== By Karski ===
- "Polish Death Camp." Collier's, 14 October 1944, pp. 18–19, 60–61.
- Courier from Poland: The Story of a Secret State, Boston 1944 (Polish edition: Tajne państwo: opowieść o polskim Podziemiu, Warszawa 1999).
- Wielkie mocarstwa wobec Polski: 1919–1945 od Wersalu do Jałty. wyd. I krajowe Warszawa 1992, Wyd. PIW ISBN 83-06-02162-2
- Tajna dyplomacja Churchilla i Roosevelta w sprawie Polski: 1940–1945.
- Polska powinna stać się pomostem między narodami Europy Zachodniej i jej wschodnimi sąsiadami, Łódź 1997.
- Jan Karski (2001). Story of a Secret State. Simon Publications. p. 391. ISBN 1-931541-39-6.

=== About Karski ===
- E. Thomas Wood & Stanisław M. Jankowski (1994). Karski: How One Man Tried to Stop the Holocaust. John Wiley & Sons Inc. page 316; ISBN 0-471-01856-2
- J. Korczak, Misja ostatniej nadziei, Warszawa 1992.
- E. T. Wood, Karski: opowieść o emisariuszu, Kraków 1996.
- J. Korczak, Karski, Warszawa 2001.
- S. M. Jankowski, Karski: raporty tajnego emisariusza, Poznań 2009.
- Henry R. Lew, Lion Hearts Hybrid Publishers, Melbourne, Australia 2012.

== See also ==
- Bermuda Conference
- Molotov–Ribbentrop Pact
- Polish Secret State
- Rescue of Jews by Poles during the Holocaust
- Victor Martin – a Belgian academic, sent by the Belgian resistance to report on the Auschwitz-Birkenau camp
- Witold Pilecki
- Irena Sendler
- Szmul Zygielbojm
