= The Mass Extermination of Jews in German Occupied Poland =

Report of the Polish government in exile in 1942

- Author: Edward Bernard Raczyński, Stanisław Mikołajczyk, others
- Language: English
- Subject: The Holocaust in Poland
- Published: 1943
- Publisher: Polish government-in-exile, Hutchinson
- Publication place: United Kingdom
- Media type: brochure
- Pages: 16
- Text: The Mass Extermination of Jews in German Occupied Poland at Wikisource

The Mass Extermination of Jews in German Occupied Poland was a brochure published by the Polish government-in-exile in 1943 to disseminate the text of Raczyński's Note of 10 December 1942. It was the first official information to the Western general public about the Holocaust in German-occupied Poland.

== History ==
The brochure contained reports and documents about the Holocaust in Poland. The most important item was Raczyński's Note, sent on 10 December 1942 to the foreign ministers of the 26 government signatories of the Declaration by United Nations. Based on intelligence from the Home Army's Jewish Affairs Bureau, Raczyński described the Germans' initial shooting executions and subsequent lethal gassings of Polish Jews. It was known that Jews deported from the Warsaw Ghetto in Grossaktion Warsaw were taken to Treblinka, Bełżec, and Sobibor, which the Polish underground state correctly described as "extermination camps". Raczyński said that one-third of the three million Polish Jews had already been killed – actually, an underestimate.

The brochure was published in 1943 and contained also the text of the Joint Declaration by Members of the United Nations of 17 December 1942, and an excerpt of a statement by Deputy Prime Minister Stanisław Mikołajczyk of 27 November 1942. The motivation for publishing the report was to draw attention to the Final Solution and deter the Germans from pursuing it further.

== Reception ==
Though the document contained extensive information on the persecution and murder of Jews in Poland, its effect was limited because many people outside German-occupied Europe found it difficult to believe the Germans were systematically exterminating Jews. After a 1943 meeting with Jan Karski, who had made multiple undercover trips into occupied Poland and escaped to warn the Allies, Jewish U.S. Supreme Court Justice Felix Frankfurter said he did not think Karski was lying, but that he could not believe him. However, the pamphlet raised awareness of the murder of Jews, and other politicians around the world were alarmed by the report.

Modern commentators have raised questions as to why the report was not published sooner, because the Polish government-in-exile had been kept apprised of the events in Poland by the underground state, the Jewish Labor Bund, and others. Emanuel Ringelblum, chronicler of the Warsaw Ghetto, accused the Polish underground state of refusing to pass along information on the murder of Jews; he believed they did so only after repeated exhortations by the Jews. However, his main complaint was with the government-in-exile, which had stayed silent about the murder of the Warsaw Jews from July to September 1942 despite sufficient evidence. According to Ignacy Schwarzbart, one of two Jewish members of the government-in-exile, the Poles feared that bringing attention to the suffering of Jews would distract the Allies from the suffering of Poles. Some historians have accepted this claim; others say it was more a matter of shock and disbelief at the news; and some have taken a middle view.

In 2013 a copy of the book sold at a Paris auction for 21,000 euros.

== See also ==
- Karski's reports
- The Polish White Book
- Pilecki's Report
