= Raczyński's Note =

1942 Polish diplomatic note

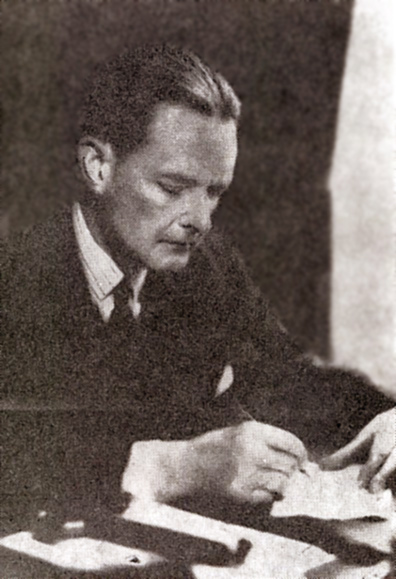
Edward Bernard Raczyński during office work

Raczyński's Note, dated December 10, 1942, and signed by Minister of Foreign Affairs Edward Raczyński, was the official diplomatic note from the government of Poland in exile regarding the extermination of the Jews in German-occupied Poland. Sent to the foreign ministers of the Allies, it was the first official report on the Holocaust to inform the Western public about these crimes. It identified Treblinka, Bełżec and Sobibór by name as extermination camps. It was also the first official speech of one of the governments of Nazi-occupied Europe in defense of all Jews persecuted by Germany – not only citizens of their country.

== History ==
"The Mass Extermination of Jews in German Occupied Poland", a brochure issued by the Polish government-in-exile, contained a copy of Raczyński's note, 1942.

The note was written by Polish diplomat, Edward Raczyński, Minister of Foreign Affairs of the Polish Exile Government in London, based on documents (materials prepared by the Jewish Affairs Department of the Polish Home Army Headquarters) transported in the form of microfilm to London by courier Jan Karski and confirmed by his certificate, and his own reports prepared in 1940–1942. Raczyński's note, dated December 10, 1942, was sent to the governments of the signatory countries of the United Nations Declaration. It was personally addressed to other foreign ministers.

On behalf of the Polish government, Raczyński informed the governments of all Allied countries about the desperate situation of Jews in the German-occupied Poland and the unfolding genocide being carried out by the Germans, and called for help.

== Contents ==
The Polish Government—as the representatives of the legitimate authority on territories in which the Germans are carrying out the systematic extermination of Polish citizens and of citizens of Jewish origin of many other European countries — consider it their duty to address themselves to the Governments of the United Nations, in the confident belief that they will share their opinion as to the necessity not only of condemning the crimes committed by the Germans and punishing the criminals, but also of finding means offering the hope that Germany might be effectively restrained from continuing to apply her methods of mass extermination.

— Edward Bernard Raczyński (1891–1993), Note to United Nations, 10 December 1942.

The note was typed on nine pages. In 21 points it presented a description of the background of the problem and the current situation of Jews in occupied Poland, a chronological description of the information campaign of the Polish government on this area, and a call for allied governments to stop the crime. The note was sent to the foreign ministers of the 26 governments that signed the Declaration by United Nations in 1942. Below is the note sent to Anthony Eden on 10 December 1942:

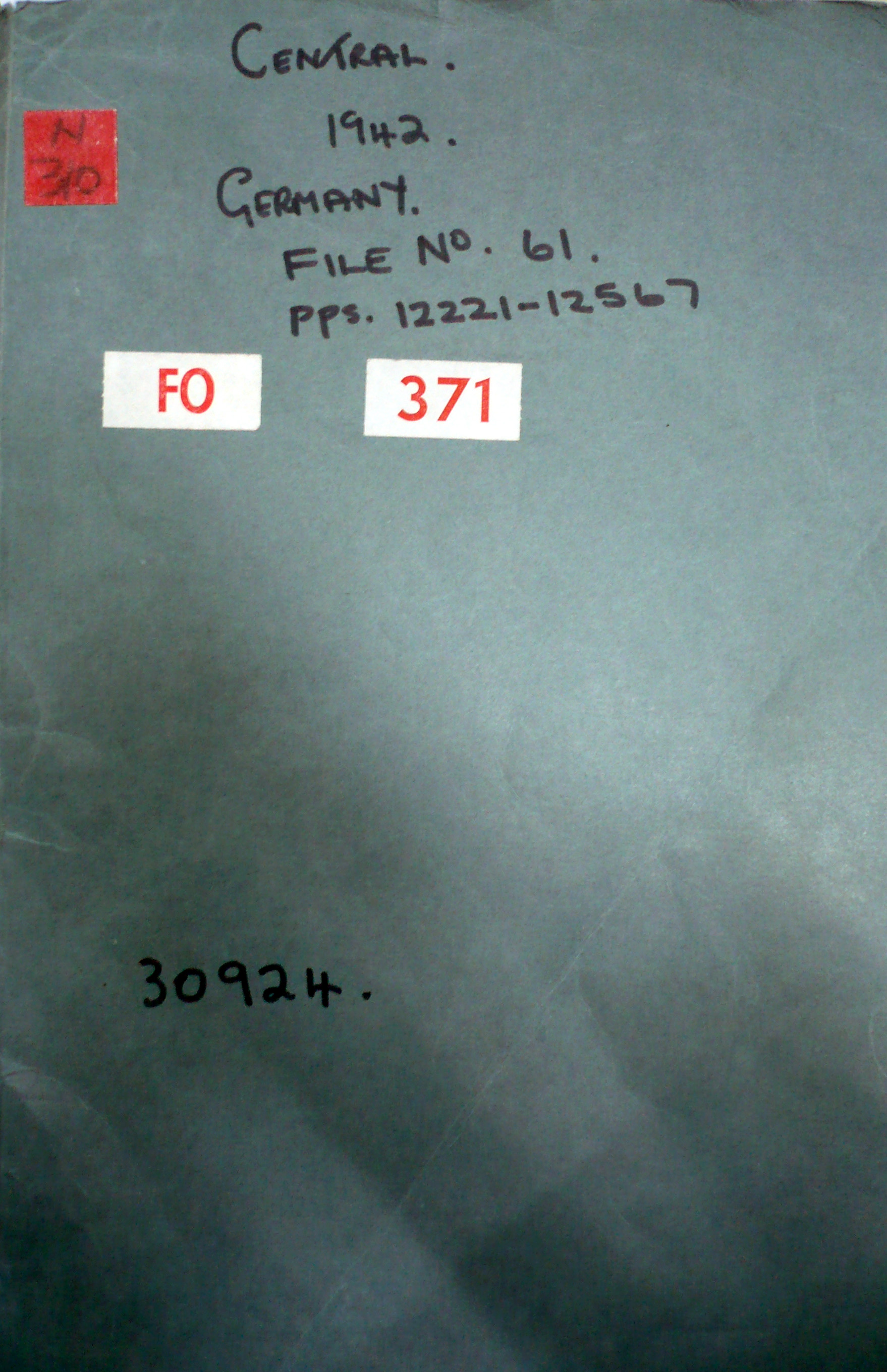
Cover of document

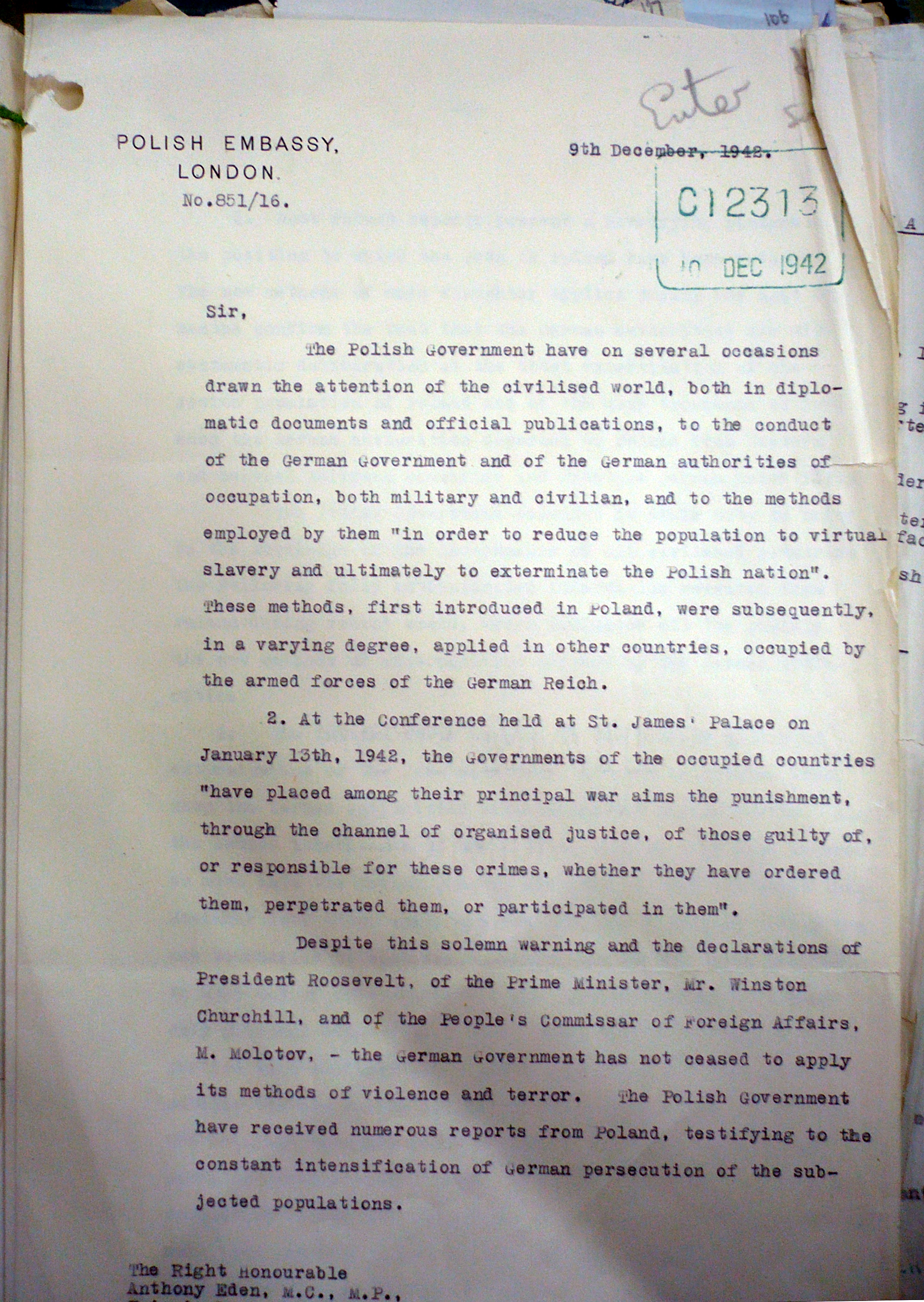
Page I, addressed to Anthony Eden (10 December 1942)

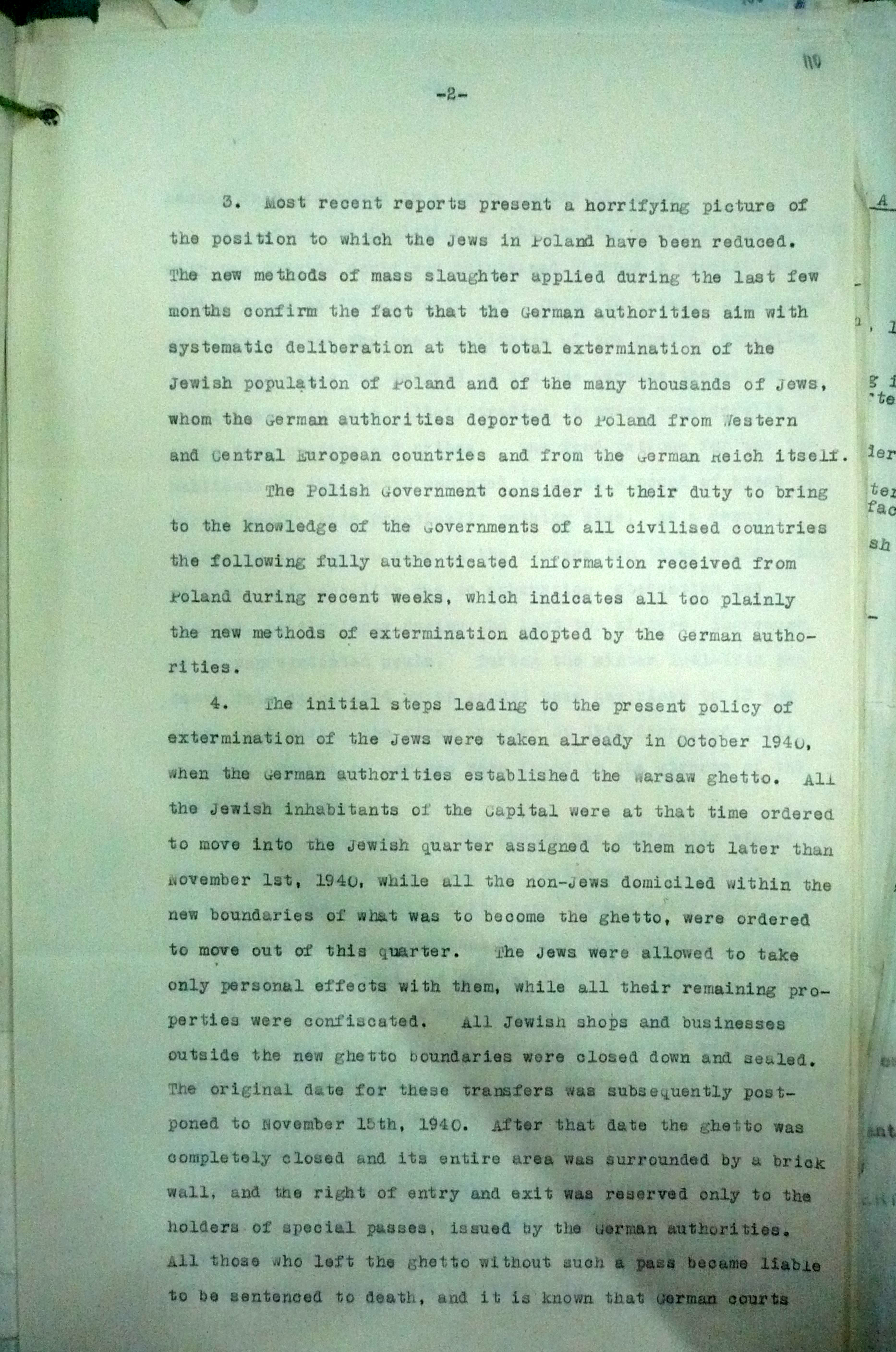
Page II

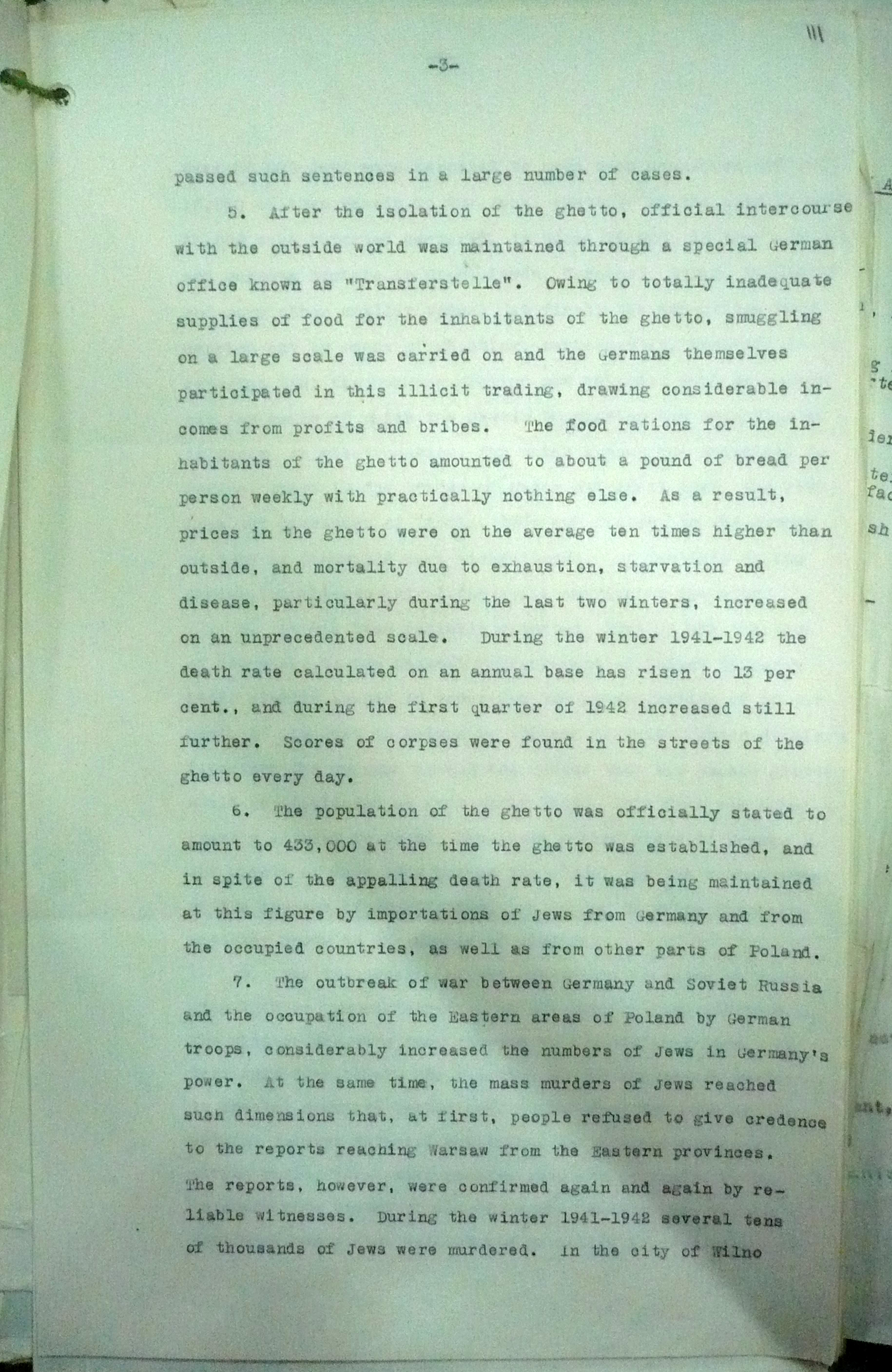
Page III

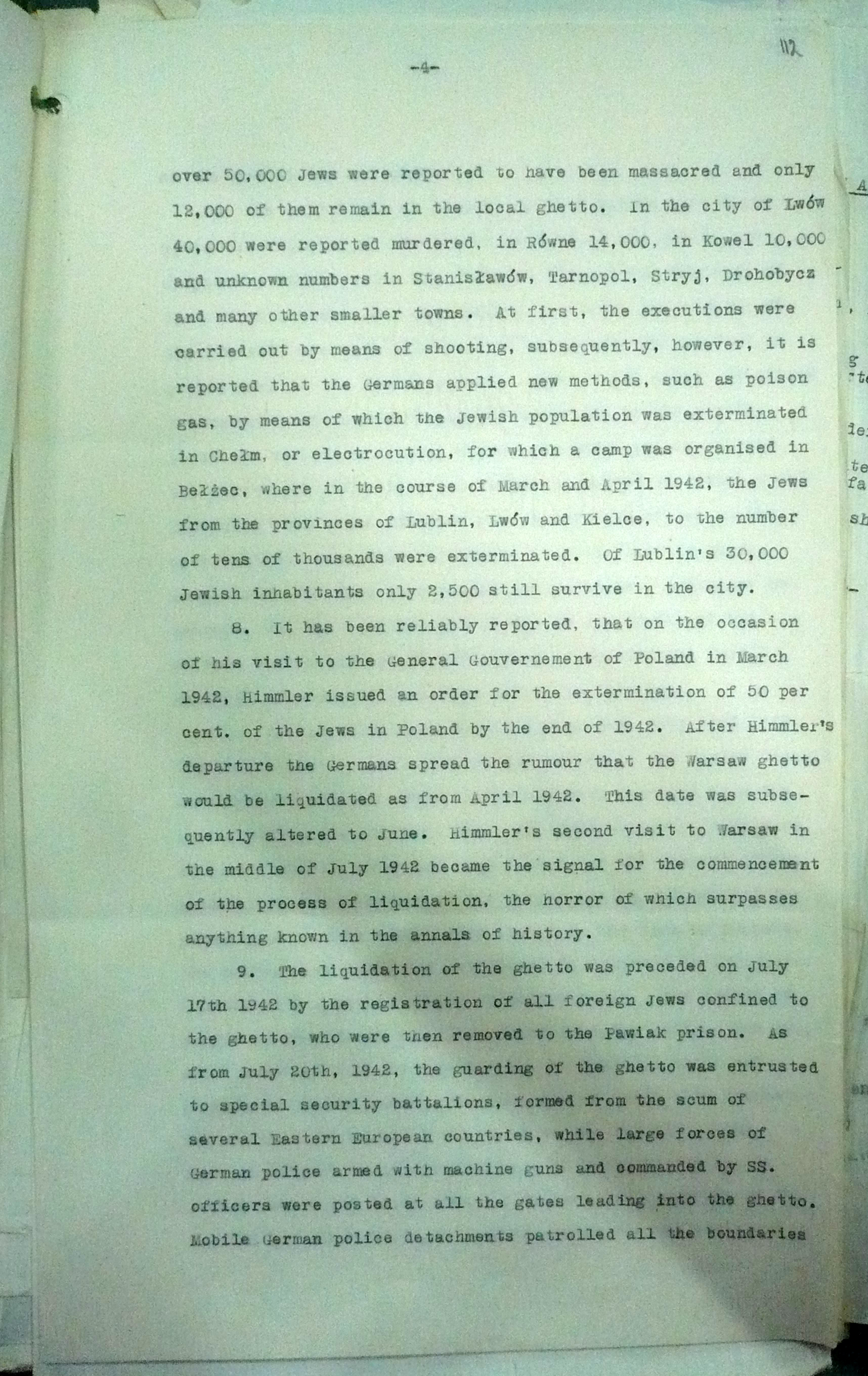
Page IV

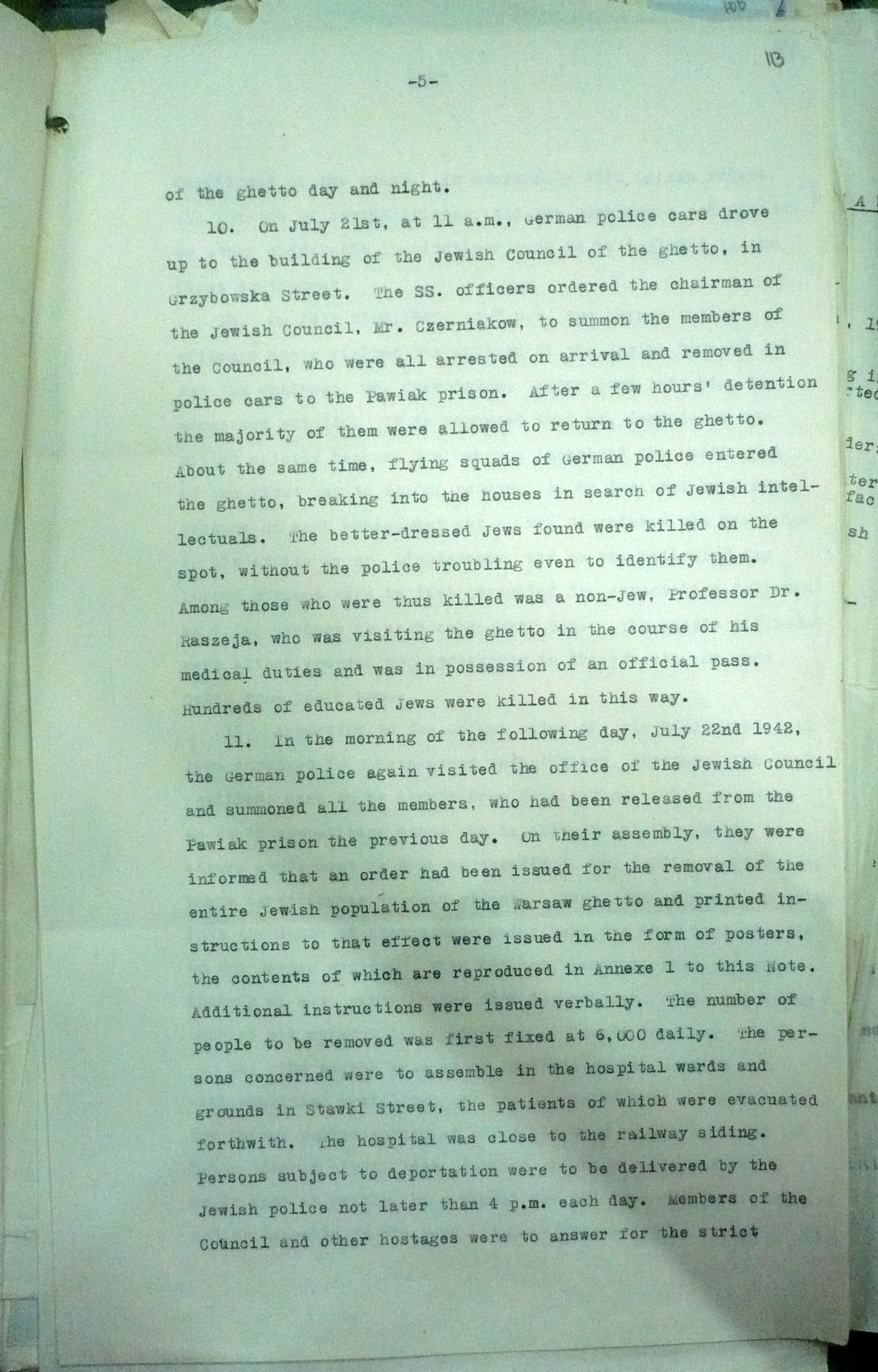
Page V

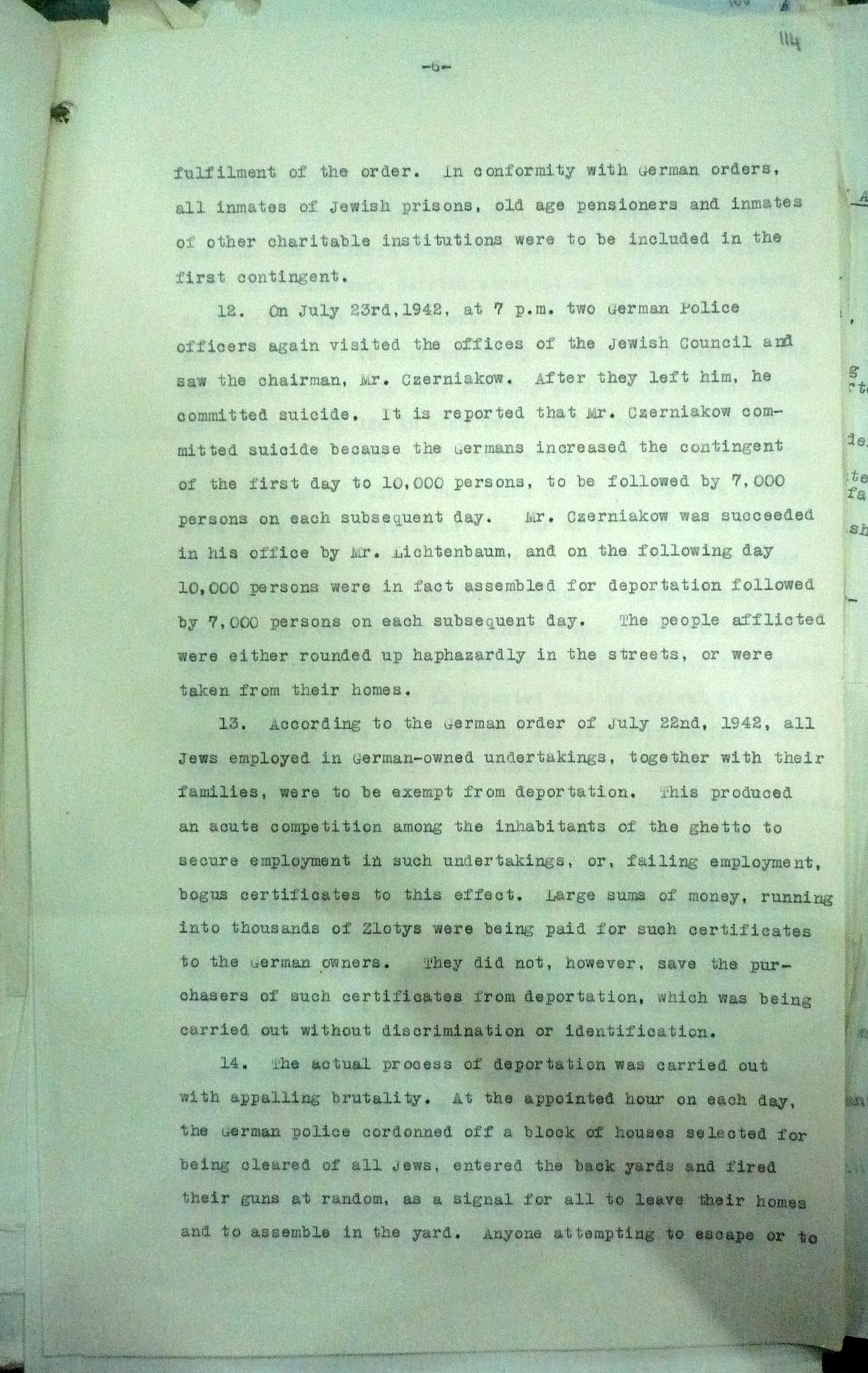
Page VI

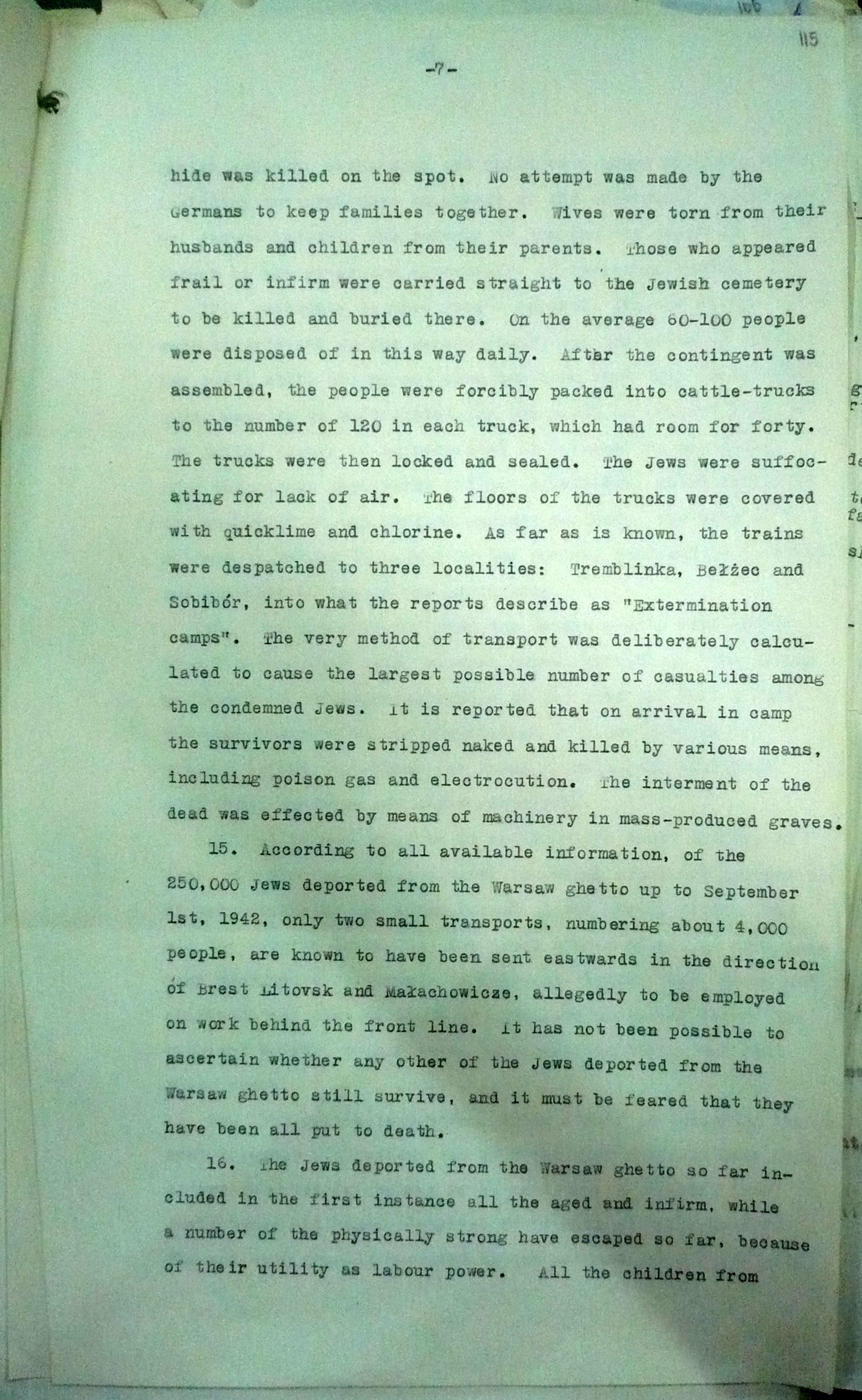
Page VII

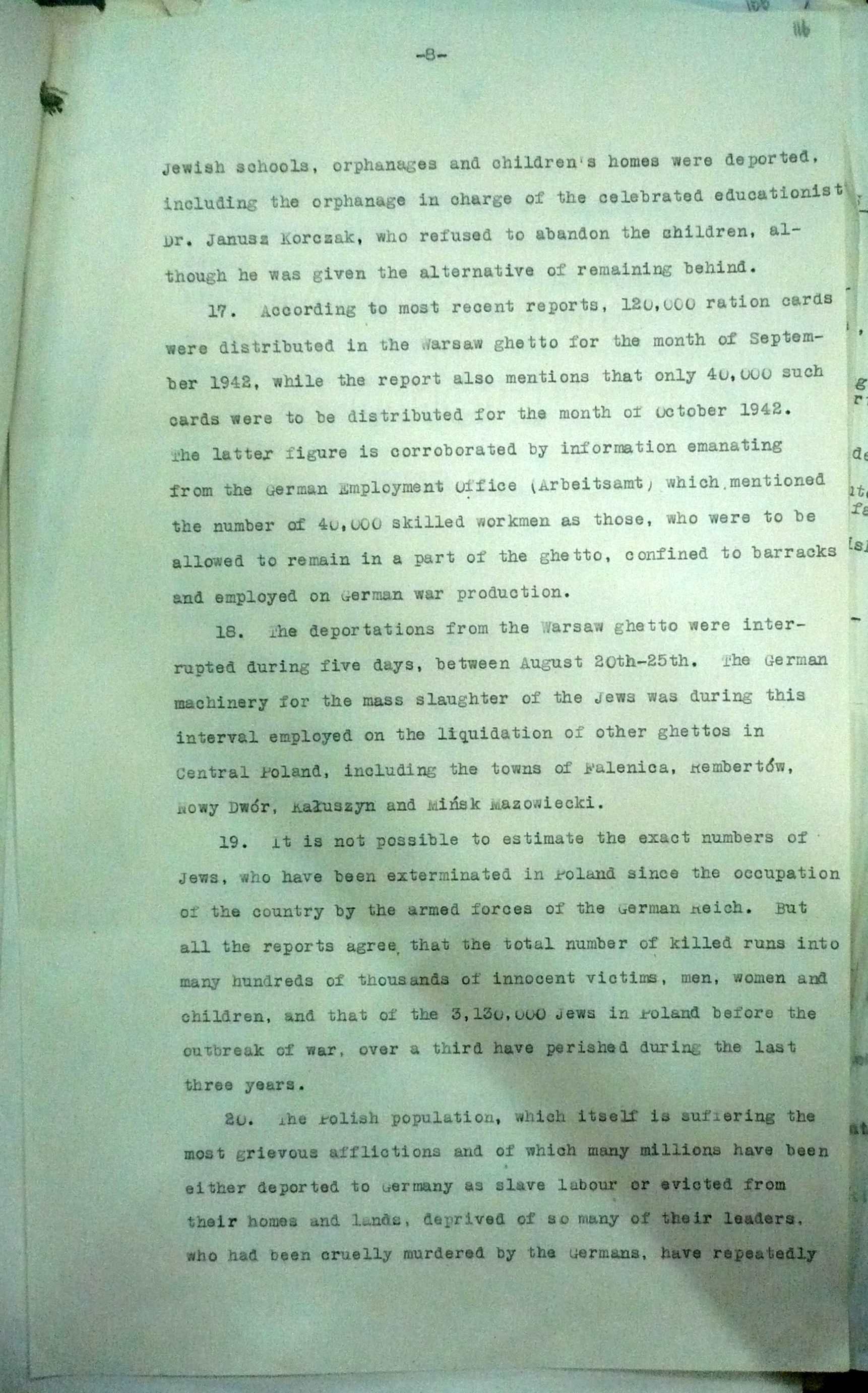
Page VIII

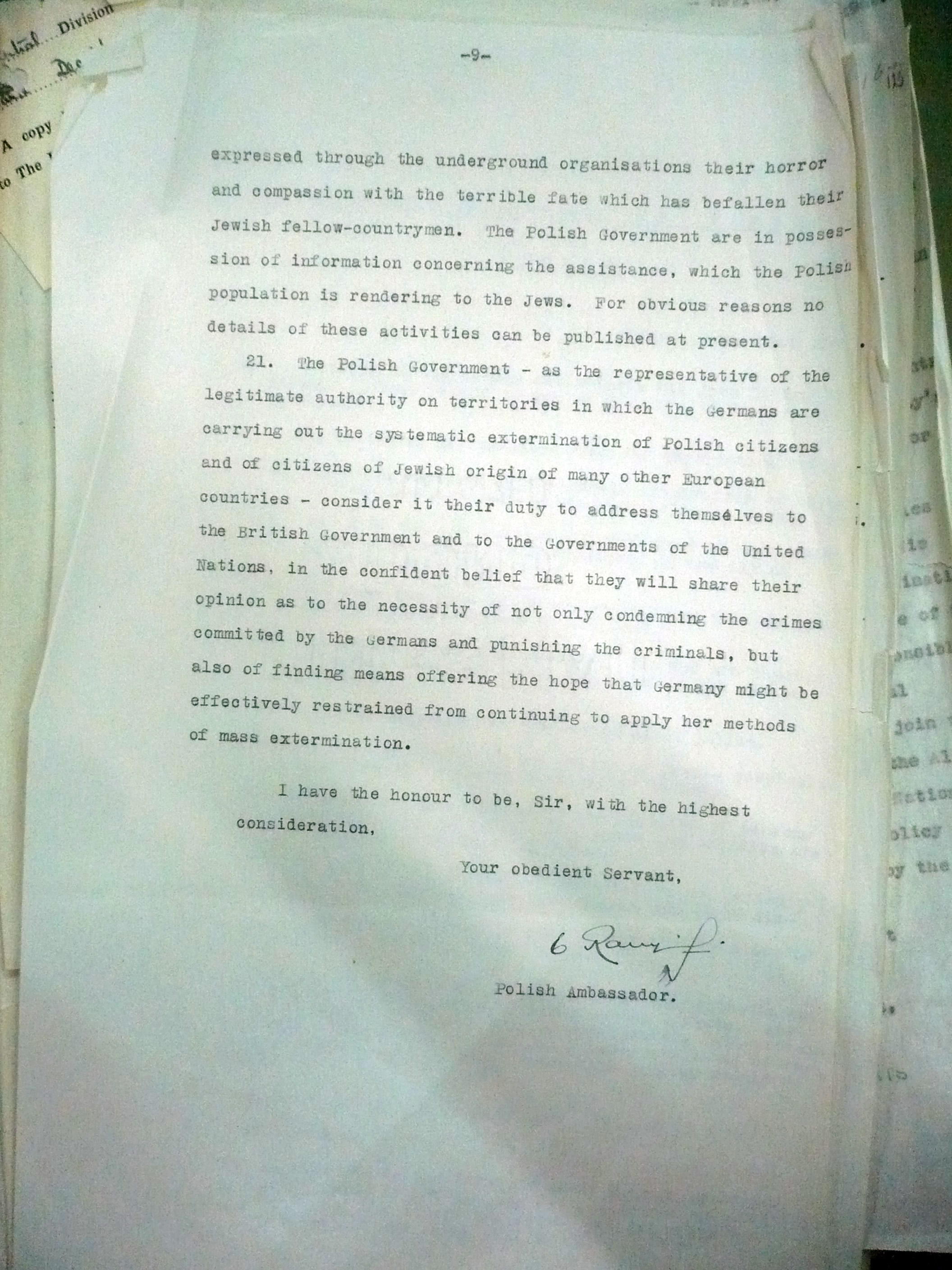
Page IX

== See also ==
- The Black Book of Poland
- Karski's reports
- The Polish White Book
- Witold's Report

== Bibliography ==
- Raczyński, Edward (1942). The Mass Extermination of Jews in German Occupied Poland. London, New York, Melbourne: Republic of Poland Ministry of Foreign Affairs.
- Wroński, Stanisław (1971). Polacy i Żydzi 1939–1945 [Poles and Jews 1939–1945] (in Polish). Warsaw: Książka i Wiedza.
- Engel, David (2014). In the Shadow of Auschwitz: The Polish Government-in-exile and the Jews, 1939–1942. UNC Press Books. ISBN 9781469619576.
