= The Karski Report =

The Karski Report, is a 2010 documentary film by Claude Lanzmann, with the interviews he carried out to Jan Karski in 1978 during the elaboration of Shoah. Karski (1914-2000) was a Polish resistance fighter, who through his series of reports, alerted the Allies during World War II to the atrocities perpetrated against the Jews.

In 1978, Claude Lanzmann recorded between 8 and 9 hours of interview with Karski, but only used 40 minutes in his film Shoah.

The Karski Report was shown for the first time on the Franco-German channel Arte, with a total running time of 49 minutes.

== Origin of the film ==
=== Interview with Jan Karski in 1978 ===
Between 1976 and 1981, Claude Lanzmann found and filmed witnesses to the Jewish genocide of the Second World War. Three hundred and fifty hours of film were shot. Lanzmann made his film Shoah (1985) from these shots. Among the interviews filmed by Lanzmann, there is that of Jan Karski, Polish resistance fighter, witness of the Warsaw Ghetto. The interview had been requested by Lanzmann in 1977, but Jan Karski, who had not spoken of the genocide for more than 20 years, refused on several occasions. Finally, the two men met in October 1978, having an interview that lasted two days (totalling eight hours). Karski talked about his meeting, in 1942, with two Jewish leaders, witnesses of the genocide, and his discovery of the Warsaw Ghetto, which he visited clandestinely with them. He also reported on his meetings with Allied leaders, including President Franklin Roosevelt, to discuss the situation in Poland and alert them to the reality of the ongoing genocide.

=== Release of the film Shoah in 1985 ===
Claude Lanzmann left in the film Shoah about forty minutes of this interview. These sequences are mainly devoted to the testimony of Karski's meeting with the two Jewish leaders and to the description of the Warsaw ghetto. We also hear Karski explain that he made the report requested by the Jewish leaders to Allied officials, but without further details...

When Shoah was released in 1985, Karski gave his impression of the film in an interview with the Polish magazine Kultura. He praised the quality of Lanzmann's work, seeing in "Shoah the greatest film that has been made on the tragedy of the Jews". Karski believed that Lanzmann was right to make the viewer aware that the genocide was a unique phenomenon, which cannot be compared to any other. However, he regretted that the film didn't mention enough the people who, risking their lives, helped save thousands of Jews, even in Poland.

Regarding his own testimony, Karski noted that what he thought was the most important part, the one that describes his efforts to alert Western governments, was not inserted in the film. He attributed this choice to questions of time and coherence, the work of Claude Lanzmann being devoted to the description of the genocide more than to the attitude of the allies or to acts of solidarity towards the Jews. But, he believed that his testimony about the indifferent reactions of Allied governments would have placed the genocide in a more appropriate historical perspective. He called for another film that shows the reserved attitude of the Allied leaders, but also the solidarity of thousands of ordinary people who sought to help the Jews.

In 1996, the entire interview with Jan Karski, conducted in 1978 by Claude Lanzmann, was deposited at the Holocaust Memorial Museum in Washington. The full interview script, as well as the filmed sequences, can be viewed there.

=== Controversy in early 2010 ===
In September 2009, the writer Yannick Haenel published a novel entitled Jan Karski (published as The Messenger in the English edition), for which he received the French awards Prix Interallié and the Prix du roman Fnac. The book has three parts. The first is directly inspired by the interview with Jan Karski in the film Shoah. The second summarizes in about 80 pages the testimony of Karski, published in 1944 under the title Story of a Secret State (My testimony before the world). The third, presented as a fiction, has 72 pages and features the character of Karski, without real conformity with the latter's own testimony. In this third part of the book, Yannick Haenel makes Jan Karski say that the Allies are complicit in the extermination of the Jews of Europe. Roosevelt is described as a lewd man, yawning, belching, indifferent to the world as Karski pointed out the reaction of the US president during their interview. These passages from the book were criticized by historian Annette Wieviorka, a specialist in the memory of the Shoah.

In January 2010, Claude Lanzmann, published in Marianne magazine, a vigorous criticism of the novel, qualifying the third part of "falsification of history". Lanzmann declared about Yannick Haenel's book: “The scenes he imagines, the words and thoughts that he attributes to real historical figures and to Karski himself are so far removed from any truth […] that we remain amazed in front of such ideological cheek, such flippancy...". Yannick Haenel responded to this criticism by claiming the freedom of the novelist: "literature is a free space where" truth "does not exist, where uncertainties, ambiguities, metamorphoses weave a universe whose meaning is never closed.".

Yannick Haenel then reproached Claude Lanzmann for not having included part of Jan Karski's testimony in Shoah because the latter's attitude "did not correspond to what he expected of him", and for making it "impossible that one can see, in his film, a Pole who is not an anti-Semite”. To which Claude Lanzmann replies that the presence in the film Shoah of Jan Karski's long moving testimony was the best proof that this was not an anti-Polish film. Referring to the reasons why he did not insert the sequences on Jan Karski's meetings with the Allied leaders, Claude Lanzmann recalled that Jan Karski testifies for forty minutes in his film, which lasts 9:30, and could not be longer. He also said: “The architecture of my film commanded the construction, the maintenance, of the dramatic tension from start to finish. Since we knew that the Jews were not saved, it struck me as stronger to let Karski say his last word in Shoah: "But I reported on what I saw." Rather than hearing him say:"I said this to so-and-so, this to so-and-so... And this is how he reacted... ".

Finally, Haenel accused Lanzmann of having trapped Karski. To convince him to let himself be interviewed in 1978, he wrote to him that the question of saving the Jews would be one of the major subjects of the film. Lanzmann replied that it was his intention to talk about this theme in his film, as well as the responsibility of the allies. However, as his investigative work progressed, he realized the complexity of this question which ultimately was not addressed.

=== Release of the film in March 2010 ===
In January 2010, Lanzmann announced that he had just finished a film entitled "The Karski Report", edited from parts of the 1978 interview that were not included in his film Shoah. Lanzmann said he had made this film with the explicit intention of re-establishing the truth about Karski. The film was broadcast for the first time in France, on March 17, 2010, on the Arte channel. Claude Lanzmann introduction at the beginning of the film, clearly links to the controversy of the previous months: “The reason for this film is the book of a certain Haenel, his Jan Karski, novel. I read it with amazement ”. The same month, in March 2010, Jan Karski's book, “My testimony in front of the world”, which was out of print in its French version, was reissued by Robert Laffont editions.

== Content ==
In the filmed interview Jan Karski describes his meeting with president Roosevelt in July 1943, to tell him about the future of Poland and alert him to the mass slaughter of Jews in Europe. He explained Roosevelt what he saw in the Warsaw Ghetto and asked help to Jews by the allies. According to Karski, Roosevelt didn't respond directly to his request, saying that the allied nations would win the war, that justice would be done and the criminals punished. Roosevelt asked him about Poland but didn't ask specific questions about the Jews. However, at the president's express request, Karski says he could then meet with influential figures in Washington. Among them, Felix Frankfurter, Supreme Court judge, himself of Jewish origin, who failed to believe him.

At the end of the film, Karski realizes that the genocide was such a new fact that the political leaders could not really understand what was happening: “This kind of event had never happened. For a normal, cultivated human being, with political responsibilities - for each of us, moreover - the brain can only function within certain limits: what our environment, with books, knowledge, information, has put in our brain. And, at some point, our brains may no longer have the capacity to understand ”.

Lanzmann placed, in the opening statement of this film, a quote from Raymond Aron, which evokes the information circulating on the genocide during the war: “I knew but I did not believe it. Since I did not believe it, I did not know it”. The director also reads, in the preamble of the film, a text saying that the Jews of Europe could not be saved during the war.

== Screenings ==
In 2011 The Karski Report was screened at the Lincoln Center together with Lanzmann's A Visitor from the Living (1977). It was also showed at the Harvard Film Archive in 2012.

The film was included for the 2013 Berlinale programme, that year Claude Lanzmann was awarded with the Honorary Golden Bear.

== Reception ==
Richard Brody, for The New Yorker, appraised the film, noting : "The descriptions that, thirty-four years after the meetings, Karski summons are of a novelistic level of precision and insight that are, in themselves, literary acts of the first order."

The Guardian writer, Stuart Jeffries, stated: "Human inability to believe in the intolerable is what The Karski Report is about".

Ronnie Scheib for Variety gave a positively review of the documentary, qualifying it as "An extraordinary if belated addendum to his epic, nine-hour Shoah”. And Eric Kohn, in Indiewire, considered the film "a powerful recollection weighted with psychological intrigue".

== See also ==
- Karski's reports
- Karski & The Lords of Humanity
