= The Abandonment of the Jews =

1984 nonfiction book by David S. Wyman

The Abandonment of the Jews: America and the Holocaust 1941–1945
- Author: David S. Wyman
- Language: English
- Genre: Non-fiction
- Publisher: Pantheon Books
- Publication date: 1984
- Publication place: United States

The Abandonment of the Jews: America and the Holocaust 1941–1945 is a 1984 nonfiction book by David S. Wyman, former Josiah DuBois professor of history at the University of Massachusetts Amherst. Wyman was the chairman of the David S. Wyman Institute for Holocaust Studies. The Abandonment of the Jews has been well received by most historians, and has won numerous prizes and widespread recognition, including a National Jewish Book Award, the Anisfield-Wolf Award, the Present Tense Literary Award, the Stuart Bernath Prize from the Society for Historians of American Foreign Relations, and the Theodore Saloutos Award of the Immigration History Society, and was nominated for the National Book Critics Circle Award."

== Argument ==
In response to Nazi determination and concerted action to remove Jews from Europe by any means necessary, the non-Axis world closed many possibilities for emigration to other countries. For example, legal immigration to safety in Palestine, an area that had been assigned by the League of Nations as a Jewish homeland for Jews who were not safe in their original countries, was severely limited by the Mandate authorities in 1939; and many nations simply refused to allow European Jews entry to their countries. As Nazi Germany gained power and inherited larger Jewish populations in conquered territories (such as Poland) the policies in most nations were either to eliminate the Jewish presence (in the case of Axis countries) or to discourage Jewish immigration (in the case of non-Axis countries.) The closing of the immigration possibilities in America is covered by Wyman in his 1968 book Paper Walls: America and the Refugee Crisis, 1938-1941. Wyman continues to document this aspect of World War II history in The Abandonment of the Jews, which covers the period of 1941–1945, when America and the Allies fought against Germany and the Final Solution Holocaust progressed to its most lethal stages.

Wyman summarizes his principal findings in the Preface (presented below in edited precis):

1. The American State Department and the British Foreign Office had no intention of rescuing large number of European Jews. On the contrary, they continually feared that Germany or other Axis nations might release tens of thousands of Jews into Allied hands. Any such exodus would have placed intense pressure on Britain to open Palestine and the United States to take in more Jewish refugees... Consequently, their policies were aimed at obstructing rescue possibilities....
2. Authenticated information that the Nazis were systematically exterminating European Jewry was made public... in November 1942. President Roosevelt did nothing... for fourteen months, then moved only because... political pressures....
3. The War Refugee Board... received little power, almost no cooperation... and grossly inadequate funding. (Contributions from Jewish organizations.... covered 90 percent of the WRB's costs)... save approximately 200,000 Jews and at least 20,000 non-Jews.
4. ... State Department... policies, only 21,000 refugees were allowed to enter... during... war with Germany... 10 percent of the number who could have been legally admitted....
5. .... factors hampered (rescue)... anti-Semitism and anti-immigration attitudes,... entrenched in Congress; the mass media's failure... near silence of the Christian churches and almost all of their leadership (with notable exceptions, such as the Archbishop of Canterbury, or New York's Archbishop Francis Spellman); indifference... President's failure....
6. American Jewish leaders... failure to assign top priority to the rescue issue.
7. In 1944 the United States... rejected several appeals to bomb the Auschwitz gas chambers and railroads... in the very months that... numerous massive American bombing raids were taking place with fifty miles of Auschwitz. Twice... bombers struck... not five miles from the gas chambers.
8. ... much more could have been done to rescue the Jews, if a real effort had been made.... the reasons repeatedly invoked by government official for not being able to rescue Jews could be put aside when it came to other Europeans who needed help.
9. ... Roosevelt's indifference... the worst failure of his presidency.
10. ... the American rescue record was better than that of Great Britain, Russia, or the other Allied nations... because of the work of the War Refugee Board... American Jewish organizations... provide most of the WRB's funding, and the overseas rescue operations of several Jewish organizations.

The Abandonment of the Jews argues that American (and British) political leaders during the Holocaust, including President Roosevelt, turned down proposals that could have saved hundreds of thousands of European Jews from death in German concentration camps. Wyman documents, for example, how Roosevelt repeatedly refused asylum to Jewish refugees and failed to order the bombing of railway lines leading to Auschwitz. At the same time, most Jewish leaders in America and in Palestine did little to pressure these governments to change their policy. Some American newspapers, including the New York Times, are said to have underreported or buried reports off their front pages because of anti-Semitism. The Times was owned by Jews but may have wanted not to appear as Jewish advocates in their coverage.

Wyman examines the documents suggesting that the US and British governments turned down numerous proposals to accept European Jews. The issue was raised at a White House conference on March 27, 1943, of top American and British wartime leaders, including Roosevelt, US Secretary of State Cordell Hull, British Foreign Secretary Anthony Eden, presidential advisor Harry Hopkins, and the British Ambassador to Washington, Lord Halifax. Hull raised the question of having the Allies offer to accept 60,000 to 70,000 Jews from Bulgaria, a German ally. Eden reportedly objected, citing the risk that Hitler may take up similar offers for the Jews of Germany and Poland, and said that "there simply are not enough ships and means of transportation to handle them."

Wyman writes that because of a combination of nativism, anti-Semitism and an unwillingness to act on any proposal not of direct strategic value, thousands and possibly millions of Jews died who might otherwise have been saved. He documents numerous cases where the Allies found resources, such as shipping, to give aid and rescue to tens of thousands of non-Jewish refugees, while at the same time denying similar aid or rescue efforts to Jews. For instance, he documents how the British government turned back endangered Jews from Mandatory Palestine, while at the same time they generously accepted between 9,000 and 12,000 non-Jewish Greek and 1,800 non-Jewish Polish refugees into Palestine. He cites many cases where American and British authorities turned down offers by Nazis to exchange Jews for resources, often with documentation on how the Allies appeared to fear that there would be so many Jews that it could strain the Allies' war effort. He also documents the efforts of the US State Dept. to deny asylum to endangered Jews, and the failure of the American Jewish establishment to put sufficient pressure on US politicians, such as Roosevelt, to engage in effective rescue operations. Breckinridge Long, one of the four assistant secretaries of state, and a clique of other State Department executives, figure prominently in many episodes in this history. Wyman documents how Long and his colleagues repeatedly obstructed measures that would have effectively rescued Jews.

Wyman cites several organizations as comparatively effective in rescue efforts, particularly some Orthodox Jewish organizations, the American Jewish Joint Distribution Committee, and the Revisionist Zionist faction called the 'Bergsonites,' which took their name from their leader, the so-called "Peter H. Bergson," which was actually the English nom-de-guerre of Hillel Kook, a Palestinian Jew and nephew of Rav Abraham Isaac Kook who was associated with the radical armed underground group Irgun Zvai Leumi. "Bergson" came to the United States to form the 'American Friends of a Jewish Palestine,' the 'Committee for a Jewish Army,' and other efforts to rescue European Jewry.

Wyman is particularly critical of the mainstream American Jewish and Zionist leadership, which was ineffective in its rescue efforts and often prioritized the fight against American anti-Semitism and strengthening the Zionist position for a postwar Jewish commonwealth in Palestine (Israel) above the need to rescue Jews from Nazi persecution.

In the chapter on 'Responsibility', Wyman has a subsection, 'What Might Have Been Done', in which he acknowledges that the possibilities for rescue were "narrowed by the Nazis' determination to wipe out the Jews" and that "War conditions themselves made rescue difficult... most likely it would not have been possible to rescue millions." He contends, however, that "without impeding the war effort, additional tens of thousands--probably hundreds of thousands--could have been saved." He then presents a selection of twelve programs that were proposed (among others) during the Holocaust that could have been effective if only they had been tried. His selection included (in edited precis):

(1) Most important, the War Refugee Board should have been established in 1942. And it should have received adequate government funding and much broader powers.
(2) The U.S. government, working through neutral governments or the Vatican, could have pressured Germany to release the Jews....
(3) The United States could have applied constant pressure on Axis satellites to release their Jews....
(4)... Strong pressure needed to be applied to neutral countries near the Axis... to take Jews in....havens of refuge outside of Europe were essential.... Thus the routes would have remained open and a continuing flow of refugees could have left Axis territory.
(5) Locating enough outside havens... presented difficulties.... a camp existence... was still preferable to... death.... other countries used American stinginess as an rebuttal when questioned for not accepting Jews. For instance, in Jerusalem on his 1942 trip around the world, Wendell Willkie confronted the British authorities with the need to admit large numbers of Jews into Palestine. The British High Commissioner replied that since the United States was not taking Jews in even up to the quota limits, Americans were hardly in a position to make such criticisms.
(6) Shipping was needed to transport Jews from neutral countries to outside havens.... Early in 1943 the United States turned its back on a Romanian proposal to release 70,000 Jews. It was a pivotal failure....
(7) A campaign to stimulate and assist escape would have led to a sizable outflow of Jews....
(8) Much larger amounts of money should have been transferred to Europe... facilitating escapes,... hiding Jews.... supplying food... strengthening Jewish undergrounds, and... non-Jewish forces.
(9) Much more effort should have gone into finding ways to send in food and medical supplies....
(10)... the United States could have applied much more pressure... on neutral governments, the Vatican, and the International Red Cross to induce them to take earlier and more vigorous action....
(11) Some military assistance was possible....

(12) Much more publicity about the extermination of the Jews should have been disseminated throughout Europe....

== Counterarguments ==
The overwhelming majority of professional historians who specialize in World War II and/or the Holocaust have generally endorsed, supported, or have been influenced by Wyman's arguments. The primary criticisms target Wyman's criticisms of Roosevelt, defend the actions of establishment Jewish organizations, and/or challenge his contention that the Allies could have effectively mitigated the slaughter of Jews by bombing the Auschwitz extermination facilities, a topic often referred to as the Auschwitz bombing debate.

James H. Kitchens III, an archivist of the United States Air Force Historical Research Center, criticized Wyman for his neglect for the situation of total war in which the Allies were enveloped and for basing his book on sociopolitical sources, without quality references to military history, which he argues is crucial to the bombing debate. Kitchens argued that it would not have been practical to bomb Auschwitz. Kitchens' two principal points are 1) the Allies did not have sufficiently detailed intelligence about the location of these facilities to reasonably target them, and 2) the logistics of bombing would have been too difficult to reasonably expect a successful result. Historian Richard Levy supports Kitchens' position. Other historians have pointed out 1) there were opportunities for the Allies to acquire sufficient military intelligence on potential Auschwitz targets, though it appears that no concerted effort was made gather such information. and 2) there were many successful Allied bombing missions that were just as difficult and were supported by comparably incomplete intelligence. The notion that the Auschwitz mission would have been particularly difficult is strongly challenged; some have speculated that Kitchens may have been influenced by the desire to defend his employer.

There are very few historians who disagree with Wyman's position that more could have been done by the Allies and Neutrals to rescue endangered European Jews. One exception is William D. Rubinstein, whose The Myth of Rescue: Why the Democracies Could Not Have Saved More Jews from the Nazis is explicitly a critical response to "The Abandonment of the Jews" and a host of other works that support Wyman's positions. Rubinstein argues that the Western powers had a creditable record of accepting immigrants, Palestine was not a potential refuge, and effective allied action against the extermination camps was not possible.

Even Wyman's most strident critics, however, acknowledge that many of Wyman's contentions are valid. Rubinstein, for instance, appears to largely agree with Wyman (and many other historians) that the influence of Palestinian Arab political leadership, led by Grand Mufti of Jerusalem Haj Amin al-Husseini, and the 1936–1939 Arab revolt in Palestine were factors in causing the British government to abandon their temporary mandate over Palestine, which was primarily to establish a homeland for the Jewish people that would be available to facilitate rescue of endangered Jews in their time of need. Both Wyman and his critics agree that their decision to abandon the mandate was embodied in the White Paper of 1939, which reduced Jewish immigration to Palestine to a yearly quota of only 10,000, with a maximum of 75,000 immigrants, and after a five-year period relegated all Jewish immigration to the approval of the Palestinian Arab polity. The long-lasting consequences to the European Jewry during the Holocaust of the abandonment of the mandate is generally recognized by Wyman's critics, though Wyman details the detrimental effects in greater detail than many of his detractors.

For instance, the differences of opinion between Rubinstein and Wyman on the issue rest principally on Rubinstein's argument that the Zionist Jews in Palestine (such as David Ben-Gurion) are primarily to blame for not giving refuge to European Jews in Palestine, rather than putting the responsibility on the British authorities or the Palestinian Arabs who violently opposed such rescue efforts. Some historians have taken Rubinstein and other Wyman critics to task for such assertions, and have directly attacked these criticisms of Wyman's positions as unscholarly "polemic."

== See also ==
- Bermuda conference
- Évian Conference
- Kindertransport
- Auschwitz bombing debate
- Jan Karski
- Witold Pilecki
- Report to the Secretary on the Acquiescence of This Government in the Murder of the Jews
