= Benjamin Akzin =

Israeli law professor and Zionist activist

Benjamin Akzin בנימין אקצין
- Born: 1904; Riga, Russian Empire
- Died: 1985 (aged 80 or 81); Israel
- Citizenship: Israeli
- Occupation: University professor of law
- Writing career
- Language: Hebrew
- Notable awards: Israel Prize (1967)

Benjamin Akzin (Hebrew: בנימין אקצין; 6 May 1904 – 1985) was an early Zionist activist and, later, an Israeli professor of law.

== Biography ==
Akzin was born in 1904 in Riga, Latvia, then in Livonia in the Russian Empire. He completed doctorates in political science and law at the universities of Vienna and Paris. He was an admirer of Ze'ev Jabotinsky and became active in the Jabotinsky's Revisionist movement and served as secretary to Jabotinsky. Following Jabotinsky break with the Zionist Organization and his founding of the New Zionist Organization (NZO), Akzin served as head of the political division of NZO from 1936 to 1941.

In the late 1930s, Akzin travelled to the United States to complete a third doctorate at Harvard University. In 1940, Akzin was sent by the NZO to Washington to lobby support for Jewish statehood. He spent a period with the legal department of the Library of Congress and was then appointed to a position on the staff of the War Refugee Board (WRB), which had been established by president Franklin D. Roosevelt in 1944, under pressure from the United States Congress, Jewish activists and the Treasury Department. In 1944, when the WRB began receiving reports of mass deportation of Jews to the gas chambers at Auschwitz and Birkenau, Akzin presented a memorandum to the WRB calling for the US to bomb the death camps themselves, which went beyond earlier proposals of bombing the railroad lines leading to the camps. Although Akzin persisted in his efforts for such action to be taken, his proposals were rejected by the US administration - at least in part because the same idea had previously been rejected by leading Jewish organizations, including the American Jewish Congress and the Jewish Agency, whose board of directors, with David Ben Gurion in the chair, voted unanimously against the proposal on June 11, 1944. However, a few days later, David Ben-Gurion and the Jewish Agency had reversed its opposition immediately upon learning that Auschwitz was indeed a death camp, and urged U.S. President Franklin Delano Roosevelt to bomb the camp and the train tracks leading to the camp.

From 1945 to 1947, Akzin served as political advisor later secretary of the US Zionist Emergency Committee.

In 1949, Akzin emigrated to Israel and joined the Faculty of Law at the Hebrew University of Jerusalem as professor of constitutional law and international relations. He served as dean of the faculty 1951-54, 1956–58 and 1961-63. In 1950, he founded the Department of Political Science of the Faculty of Social Sciences at the Hebrew University, and served as its department chair until the early 1960s.

Later, Aktzin was a founder of the University of Haifa and served as its first rector.

== Awards and honours ==
- In 1967, Akzin was awarded the Israel Prize for Jurisprudence.

== Selected works ==
- Problèmes fondamentaux du droit international publique (1929)
- The Palestine Mandate in Practice (1939)
- Studies in Law (editor), Scripta Hierosolymitana, Vol. V (Hebrew University Magnes Press, 1958)
- New States and International Organizations (1955)
- The Role of Parties in Israeli Democracy (1961)
- Torat ha-Mishtarim (1963)
- State and Nation (Anchor Books, 1964)
- The political status of Diaspora Jews (the Institute of Contemporary Jewry, 1966)
- Sugyot ha-Mishpat u-ve-Medina'ut (1966)
- Riga to Jerusalem (the Library by the World Zionist Organization, 1989) – autobiography published after his death

== See also ==
- List of Israel Prize recipients
