= Pilecki's Report =

1943 document about the Auschwitz concentration camp

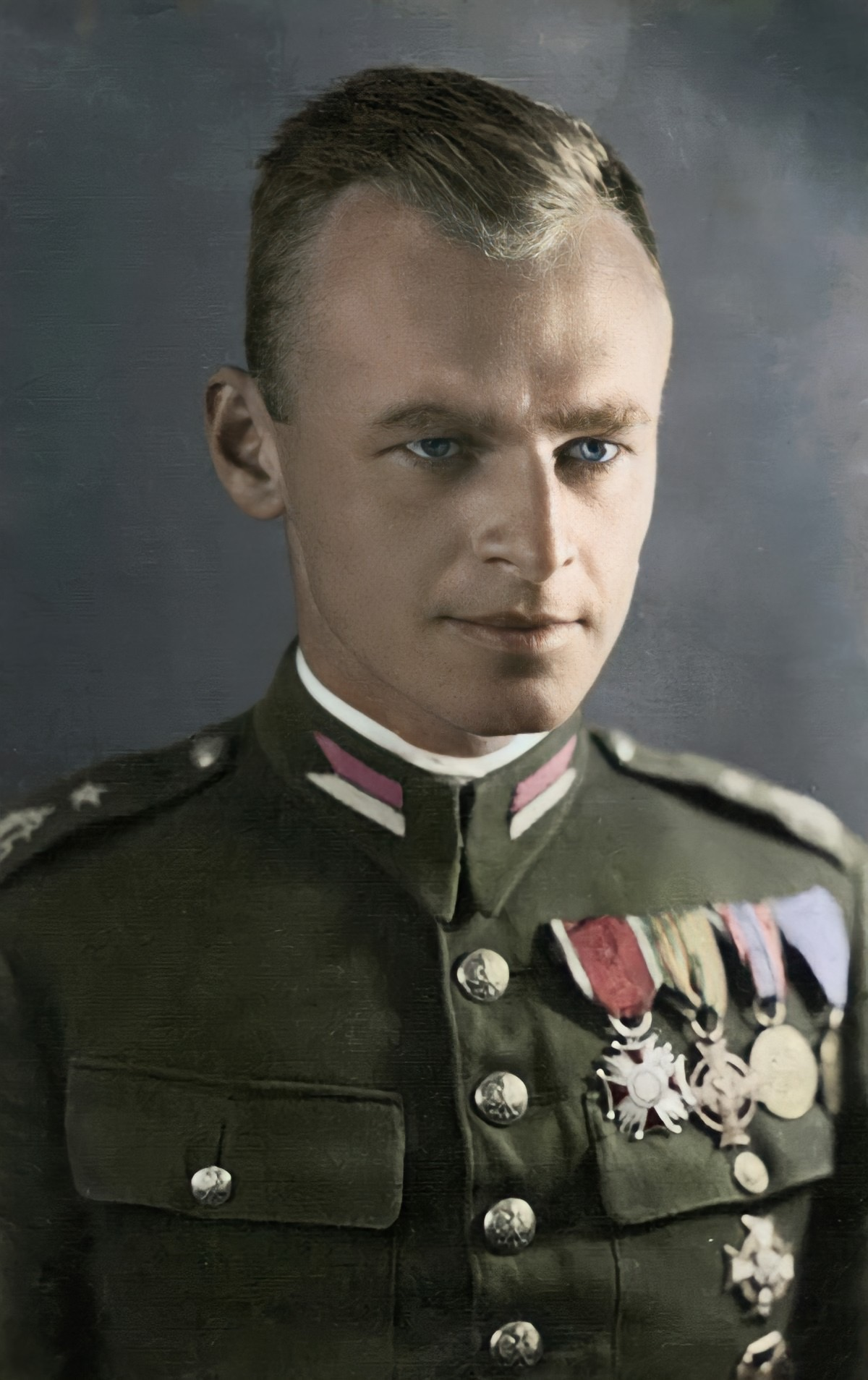
Witold Pilecki

Pilecki's Report, also known as Witold's Report, is a report about the Auschwitz concentration camp written in 1943 by Witold Pilecki, a Polish military officer and member of the Polish resistance. Pilecki volunteered in 1940 to be imprisoned in Auschwitz to organize a resistance movement and send out information about the camp. He escaped from Auschwitz in April 1943. His was the first comprehensive record of a Holocaust death camp to be obtained by the Allies.

The report includes details about the gas chambers, "Selektion", and sterilization experiments. It states that there were three crematoria in Auschwitz II capable of cremating 8,000 people daily.

Pilecki's Report preceded and complemented the Auschwitz Protocols, compiled from late 1943, which warned about the mass murder and other atrocities taking place at the camp. The Auschwitz Protocols comprise the Polish Major's Report by Jerzy Tabeau, who escaped with Roman Cieliczko on 19 November 1943 and compiled a report between December 1943 and January 1944; the Vrba-Wetzler report; and the Rosin-Mordowicz report.

== Background ==
On 9 November 1939, after the Polish Army had been defeated in the invasion of Poland, Cavalry Captain Witold Pilecki, together with his commander, Major Jan Włodarkiewicz, founded the Secret Polish Army (Tajna Armia Polska, TAP). In 1940 Pilecki presented to his superiors a plan to enter Germany's Auschwitz concentration camp, gather intelligence on the camp, and organize inmate resistance. At the time, little was known about how the Germans ran the camp, which appeared to operate as an internment, or large prison, camp. Pilecki's superiors approved his plan and provided him with a false identity card in the name of "Tomasz Serafiński". On 19 September 1940 he deliberately went out during a Warsaw street roundup (łapanka) and was caught by the Germans, along with some 2,000 innocent civilians. After two days' detention in the Light Horse Guards Barracks, where prisoners suffered beatings with rubber batons, Pilecki was sent to Auschwitz and was assigned inmate number 4859.

=== Auschwitz ===
Inside the camp Pilecki organized an underground military organization (Związek Organizacji Wojskowej, ZOW), connected with other smaller underground organizations. Pilecki planned a general uprising in Auschwitz and hoped that the Allies would drop arms or troops into the camp (most likely the Polish 1st Independent Parachute Brigade, based in Great Britain), and that the Home Army would organize an assault on the camp from outside. In 1943, the Gestapo redoubled its efforts to ferret out ZOW members, succeeding in killing many of them. Pilecki decided to break out of the camp, hoping to personally convince Home Army leaders about his idea of the uprising in Auschwitz. On the night of April 26/27, 1943, Pilecki made a daring escape from the camp, but the Home Army did not accept his insurgency plan, as the Allies considered his reports about the Holocaust exaggerated.

== Report ==
ZOW's intelligence network inside the camp started to send regular reports to the Home Army starting in October 1940. Beginning in November 1940, the first information about genocide occurring in the camp was sent via ZOW to the Home Army headquarters in Warsaw. From March 1941 onwards Witold Pilecki's messages were forwarded to the Polish government in exile in London and, through it, to the British government and other Allied governments. These reports informed the Allies about the unfolding Holocaust and were the principal source of intelligence on Auschwitz-Birkenau for the Western Allies.

On June 20, 1942, four Poles, Eugeniusz Bendera, Kazimierz Piechowski, Stanisław Gustaw Jaster and Józef Lempart, made a daring escape from Auschwitz. Dressed as members of the SS-Totenkopfverbände, fully armed and in an SS staff car, they drove out the main gate in a stolen automobile, a Steyr 220 belonging to Rudolf Höss. Jaster, a member of ZOW, carried with him a detailed report about conditions in the camp, written by Pilecki. The Germans never recaptured any of them.

After his own daring escape from Auschwitz on April 27, 1943, Pilecki wrote Raport W. The report was signed by other members of the Polish underground who worked with ZOW: Aleksander Wielopolski, Stefan Bielecki, Antoni Woźniak, Aleksander Paliński, Ferdynand Trojnicki, Eleonora Ostrowska and Stefan Miłkowski, and it included a section called "Teren S" which contained a list of ZOW members. Later, after his release from the German prisoner-of-war camp at Murnau in 1945, Pilecki compiled a version of the report that was over 100 pages long.

The first publication of Witold's Report took place in 2000, 55 years after the war, after it was reconstructed and published by Adam Cyra in his book Rotmistrz Pilecki. Ochotnik do Auschwitz. Additional documents were discovered in 2009. An English translation was published in 2012 under the title The Auschwitz Volunteer: Beyond Bravery.

== See also ==
- Raczyński's Note
- The Polish White Book
- The Black Book of Poland
- Auschwitz Protocols
- The Volunteer
- Vrba–Wetzler report
- Karski's reports
- Pilecki Institute
- Bibliography of the Holocaust § Primary Sources
