= Natalia Zarembina =

Polish writer (1895–1973)

- Born: Natalia Lipszyc; 1895
- Died: 30 April 1973 (aged 77–78); Warsaw, Warsaw Voivodeship, Polish People's Republic
- Resting place: Powązki Cemetery
- Writing career
- Pen name: Wita Marcinkowska
- Period: Long twentieth century
- Notable work: Auschwitz: The Camp of Death
- Movement: Socialism
- WWII
- Allegiance: Poland
- Branch: Polish resistance
- Service years: 1939-45
- Underground organisations: PPS-WRN; Żegota

Natalia Zarembina (née Lipszyc; 1895 – April 30, 1973 in Warsaw) was a Polish writer and journalist, activist of the Polish Socialist Party – Freedom, Equality, Independence, Council for Aid to Jews, and participant in the underground resistance movement in occupied Poland.

== Biography ==
Zarembina's husband was Zygmunt Zaremba. She also used the literary pseudonym "Wita Marcinkowska".

In December 1942, Zarembina published in occupied Warsaw the book Obóz śmierci (eng. Death Camp), which was the first documentary about the German concentration camp Auschwitz. The author contained the information based on reports of refugees or people dismissed from the camp, mainly Eryk Lipinski (camp number 20022), Henryk Świątkowski (unidentified number) and Edward Bugajski (camp number 16929).

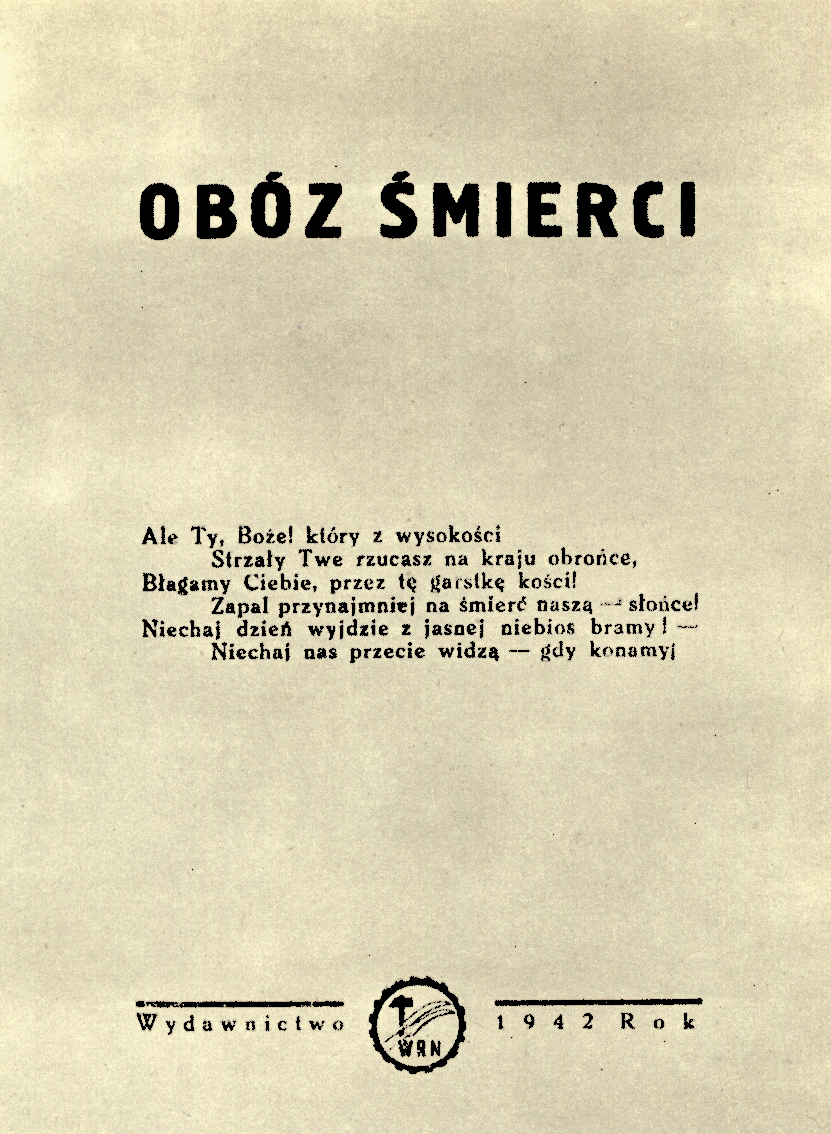
Conspiratorial reportage about Auschwitz "Camp of death" written by Natalia Zarembina in 1942.

In 1943, the report was translated into English and published in London under the title Auschwitz: The Camp of Death. In 1944, the book appeared under the same title in New York. In the years 1943-1945, it was also published in seven other languages.

In 1946, Zarembina left Poland as a political exile. She published books there under the occupation pseudonym "Wita Marcinkowska". In 1970, three years after the death of her husband, who died in 1967 in France, she returned to Poland. She died in Warsaw on April 30, 1973.

In 2005, after 60 years, a reprint of the book on Auschwitz containing the Polish text printed in 1942 and two English translations was published. The book was distributed to the guests of the anniversary ceremonies in Oświęcim in 2005.

== Works ==
- Oświęcim Death Camp , Warsaw (1942), London (1943), New York (1944),
- Poland punishing (1943),
- Kroniki Generalnej Guberni. Historia kraju pod niemiecką okupacją, (1945),
- Russian month (1948).

== Bibliography ==
- Zarembina, Natalia (1942). Obóz śmierci (in Polish). Warszawa: PPS WRN.
- Zarembina, Natalia (1944). Auschwitz. The Camp of Death. New York: Poland Fights.
- Zarembina, Natalia (2005). Auschwitz. Obóz śmierci. The Camp of Death (in English and Polish). Warszawa: EDIPRESSE. ISBN 83-89571-77-3.
- Marcinkowska, Wita (1945). Kroniki Generalnej Guberni: opowiadania z kraju pod okupacją niemiecką. (eng. General Gouvernment Chronicle. Stories from a country under German occupation") (in Polish). Londyn: Wydawnictwo Światowego Związku Polaków z Zagranicy.
