= The Black Book of Poland =

Report by the Polish government-in-exile

The Black Book of Poland The German New Order in Poland
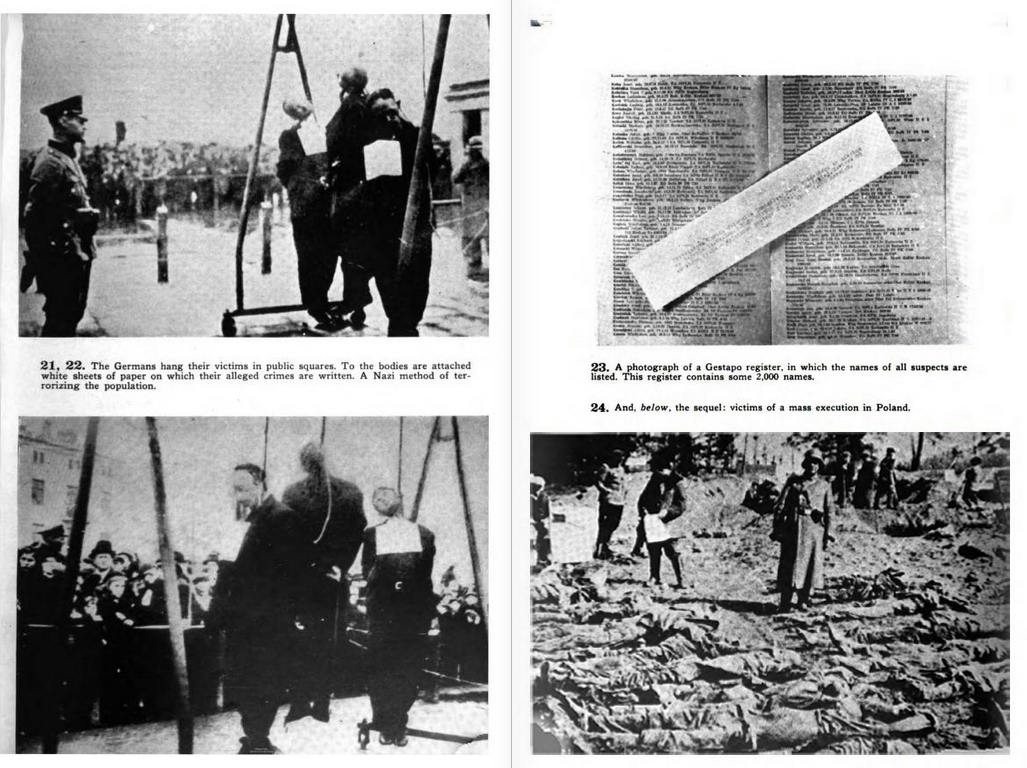
- Plates 21–24 inserted between pages 74 and 75 of The Black Book, illustrating Part I. Massacres and Tortures: 21–22: Hangings of civilians; 23. Page from Special Prosecution Book-Poland; 24. Aftermath of a massacre
- Author: Authority of the Polish Ministry of Information
- Published: G.P. Putnam's Sons, New York; London edition has title: The German New Order in Poland. Published by Hutchinson & Co., London, UK
- Publisher: Ministry of Information of the Polish government-in-exile
- Publication date: 1942
- Media type: Hardcover
- Pages: 750
- OCLC: 489805

The Black Book of Poland is a 750-page report published in 1942 by the Ministry of Information of the Polish government-in-exile, describing atrocities committed by Germany in occupied Poland in the 22 months between the invasion of Poland in September 1939 and the end of June 1941.

All the estimates, presented in the book section by section, are based on data collected while the war in the East was in progress, and the killing of Jews by means of carbon monoxide gas during Operation Reinhard – launched in 1942 to implement the "Final Solution" – had only begun. All casualties are partly summarized. The book documents over 400,000 cases of deliberate killings – an average of 1,576 per day.

The Black Book of Poland is considered a follow-up to The Polish White Book of 1941.

== Contents ==
The Black Book is a collection of authenticated documents, depositions, eye-witness accounts, and Ministerial summaries, describing and illustrating with photographs, the Nazi crimes against the Polish nation and War crimes in occupied Poland during World War II committed in mere two years: including massacres, tortures, expulsions, forced colonization, persecution, destruction of culture, and humiliation of a nation.

The book is a sequel to The German Invasion of Poland compiled by the Polish government-in-exile and published in 1940, sometimes considered as the first volume of this publication series. The original volume deals with the war crimes of the September 1939 invasion of Poland. The Black Book by G.P. Putnam's Sons of New York (or the 'second volume' of The Black Book of Poland) was published in London by Hutchinson under a different title: The German New Order in Poland, with only 585 pages and 61 plates. The Black Book is composed of nine sections, preceded by an Introduction titled 'Hora Tenebrarum'. All sections include long Appendices.

=== Book sections ===
1. Part I. Massacres and Tortures
2. Part II. The Expulsion of the Polish Population from its Land
3. Part III. The Persecution of the Jews, and the Ghettos
4. Part IV. The Robbery of Public and Private Property
5. Part V. The Economic Exploitation of Polish Territories under German Occupation
6. Part VI. Religious Persecution
7. Part VII. Humiliation and Degradation of the Polish Nation
8. Part VIII. The Destruction of Polish Culture
9. Part IX. Violations by the Reich of International Law.

== See also ==
- Karski's reports
- Bibliography of the Holocaust § Primary Sources
- The Polish White Book
