= The Polish White Book =

Series of reports during World War II

- Author: Authority of the Polish Ministry of Information
- Series: Volume 1: Official Documents Concerning Polish-German and Polish-Soviet Relations 1933–1939; Volume 2: German Invasion of Poland; Volume 3: German Occupation of Poland. Extract of Note Addressed to The Allied and Neutral Powers
- Published: The Greystone Press, New York and wydawnictwo RÓJ in exile, Publishers
- Publisher: Republic of Poland Ministry of Foreign Affairs of the Polish government-in-exile
- Publication date: 1941
- Media type: Hardcover
- Pages: 243
- OCLC: 82971798

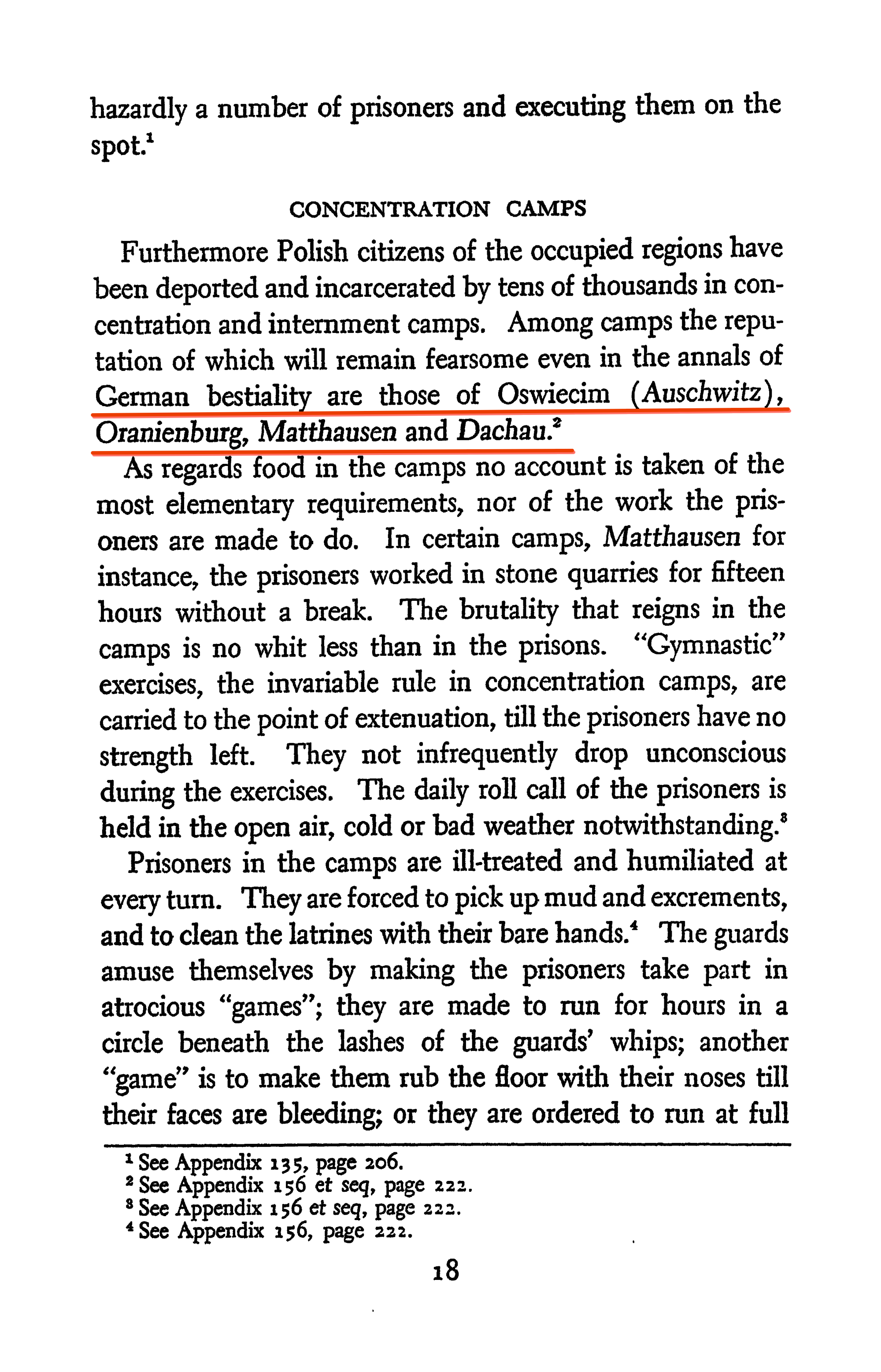
German concentration camps: Auschwitz, Oranienburg, Mauthausen and Dachau in "Polish White Book".

The Polish White Book is a semi-official name of a series of comprehensive reports published during World War II by the Ministry of Information of the Polish government-in-exile in London, England, dealing with Polish-German relations before and after the 1939 German-Soviet aggression against Poland.

Each publication, released in English, French, German and Polish between 1940 and 1941, consisted of official documents and affidavits, supplemented with an overview by the Ministry.

The Polish White Book was released in parallel with The Black Book of Poland series by G.P. Putnam's Sons of New York, published in London by Hutchinson & Co under a differing title in 1942.

== Publishing history ==
The first volume of the White Book publication series, released in the spring of 1940, was titled Official Documents Concerning Polish-German and Polish-Soviet Relations 1933–1939 – Polish White Book. The book described and documented the Polish-German negotiations in the lead-up to World War II. The second volume of the White Book – sometimes considered to be the first volume of The Black Book of Poland – was titled German Invasion of Poland (L'Invasion Allemande en Pologne, Paris: Flammarion, 1940).

The third volume of The Polish White Book was titled German Occupation of Poland. Extract of Note Addressed to The Allied and Neutral Powers. It is a 240-page report, published in 1941 during World War II by the Ministry of Information of the Polish government-in-exile, describing atrocities committed by Germany in occupied Poland. It contains 180 appendixes with lists, names, dates, and the circumstances of Nazi brutality toward Polish civilians, including men, women and children. Most of the book consists of appendixes, documenting the locations of Nazi ghettos where thousands of Jews perished, and the shift in extermination methods from shooting to poisoning by gas. The affidavits confirm Heinrich Himmler’s personal involvement in the liquidation of the Warsaw Ghetto and the final transports to death camps. The Polish White Book was written as a plea for help to the world community. At the time of its compilation, there were two million Polish Jews still alive in occupied Poland, hoping for an international rescue effort.

== Contents ==
As the reports of Nazi war crimes in occupied Poland increased dramatically, new volumes of The Polish White Book series were released. The German Occupation of Poland (1941) – also known as the second volume of The German Invasion of Poland (1940) – is sometimes considered a preamble to The Black Book of Poland (1942) by the Polish government-in-exile. The White Books by the Polish Ministry were released over the course of two years. The original Polish White Book, along with its subsequent volumes were published in both Paris by Flammarion and in London by Hutchinson & Co.^{[p. 13 of 253 in PDF]}

The final White Book, titled German Occupation of Poland. Extract of Note Addressed to the Allied and Neutral Powers was released by Greystone Press of New York in 1941. The book contained a 55-page overview, signed by Auguste Zaleski in London on May 3, 1941, and 180 appendices with evidence of forced expulsions and deportations of Jews to overcrowded ghettos, where starvation and disease were commonplace, along with evidence of deliberate destruction of the Polish nationhood, in a total of 243 printed pages.

The White Book was followed by The Black Book of Poland printed by G.P. Putnam's Sons of New York in 1942. It was a collection of authenticated documents, depositions, eye-witness accounts, and Ministerial summaries, describing and illustrating with photographs, the Nazi crimes against the Polish nation and War crimes in occupied Poland during World War II, committed in a mere two years, including massacres, tortures, expulsions, forced colonization, persecution, destruction of culture, and humiliation of a nation.

=== German Occupation of Poland (1941). Sections ===
1. Note
2. Outrages Against Persons
3. Outrages Against Religion
4. Outrages Against Polish Culture
5. Outrages Against Property

Appendices

1. The Law and Customs of War on Land-ivth Hague Convention
2. German Documents
3. Polish Documents

== See also ==
- The Black Book of Poland
- Karski's reports
- Pilecki's Report
- Vrba–Wetzler report
- Bibliography of the Holocaust § Primary Sources
