= Karski's reports =

Series of documents on the extermination of Jews in Poland

Karski's reports were a series of reports attributed to Jan Karski, an investigator working for the Polish government-in-exile during World War II, describing the situation in occupied Poland. They were some of the first documents on the Holocaust in Poland received by the Polish government in exile, and, through it, by the Western Allies.

For the 1942 report attributed to him, considered a cornerstone of his legacy, the attribution to Karski is unconfirmed. No reliable sources exist for the actual content of the information Karski carried with him to the West, and the information contained in the official reports may actually have come from other couriers.

== Reports ==
"The Mass Extermination of Jews in German Occupied Poland". Document by the Polish government-in-exile based on Karski's reports, addressed to the wartime allies of the then-United Nations, 10 December 1942.

Karski, who fought as a non-commissioned officer during the German invasion of Poland in 1939 and subsequently escaped from a prisoner-of-war transport, wrote his first report on the situation in Poland in late 1939. Subsequently, he escaped from Poland to France, where he joined the recreated Polish Army, and after coming to the attention of the Polish government-in-exile due to qualities like his photographic memory, he became a courier and an investigator, travelling several times between occupied Poland and France (later, the United Kingdom).

His reports contained information about various aspects of the situation in occupied Poland, including topics such as the extent of Polish resistance, and on numerous German war crimes and atrocities, including the ongoing Holocaust, at that point mostly unknown in the West. His first two reports delivered to the government in exile in 1940 were entitled "Selected political and ideological issues in Poland" and "The Jewish situation". Joshua D. Zimmerman called his work the "Home Army's first comprehensive report on the situation of Polish Jews". and David Engel referred to it as "the first comprehensive discussion of Jewish matters in occupied Poland to have reached the [Polish] government [in exile]. His first report, compiled in France in 1940, was commissioned by a Polish leader Stanisław Kot, who asked Karski to write up his observations on several issues, among them, implicitly, the situation of the Polish Jews.

Karski wrote several more reports in the following years. His fourth report was also focused on the plight of the Jews.

For the 1942 report attributed to him, considered a cornerstone of his legacy, the attribution to Karski is unconfirmed. No reliable sources exist for the actual content of the information Karski carried with him to the West, and the information contained in the official reports may actually have come from other couriers.

== Reception and significance ==
In 1942 Karski visited London, where he met with Polish and British officials, and other prominent people. A year later he visited the United States. Although information regarding the Holocaust constituted only a small part of the information he collected and delivered, it became one of the most influential parts of his reports. The Polish government used Karski's reports to appeal to the Western Allies to interfere with the German atrocities against the Polish Jews, though by 1943 the appeals had not produced any results, as most Western leaders were not interested in or did not believe such revelations, and the Polish government officials themselves saw Jewish public opinion as unfavorable towards the Polish state. The Western Allies' response was indeed lackluster. Nechma Tec wrote that "Karski's reports about the Jewish plight and the messages from the Jewish leaders that inevitably pleaded for help fell on deaf ears". Until the revelations late in the war, many Western politicians, and even some Jewish leaders, remained skeptical of Karski's reports, which were called "atrocity propaganda". Similarly, most newspapers treated Karski's revelations as "a minor story".

In 2010 Claude Lanzmann, who interviewed Karski in 1978 and in 1985 used part of that interview in his film Shoah, released a documentary focused on Karski, titled The Karski Report .

== See also ==
- Raczyński's Note
- Witold's Report
- The Mass Extermination of Jews in German Occupied Poland
