= Kolos (name) =

Kolos is both a surname and a given name. Notable people with the name include:

- Serhiy Kolos, Ukrainian Paralympic athlete
- Ákos Kolos, Hungarian lawyer
- Włodzimierz Kołos (1928–1996), Polish chemist and physicist
- Kolos Ferenc Vaszary (1832–1915), Hungarian Roman Catholic cardinal
