= Jewish councils in Hungary =

Councils set up during Nazi occupation

Jewish councils or Judenräte (Hungarian: zsidó tanácsok) were administrative bodies in Hungary, which were established following the German invasion of Hungary on 19 March 1944. Similar to elsewhere in German-occupied Europe during World War II, these councils purported to represent local Jewish communities in dealings with the Nazi authorities.

The Jewish Council of Budapest, under various names, was quickly established on the day after the occupation under the leadership of Samu Stern. It had national jurisdiction in principle, and tried to maintain contact with the councils created in rural settlements. Outside Budapest, however, local Jewish councils existed for only days or weeks, because the full-scale deportation of the Jews in the countryside began almost immediately, wiping out entire communities by the beginning of the summer. A significant number of Budapest's Jews avoided this fate. Following the Arrow Cross Party's takeover in October 1944, the Budapest Ghetto was established. The Jewish Council of Budapest, during the siege of the capital, tried to ensure the survival of the Jews by obtaining food and medicine, and by organizing within the city walls. The council disbanded when the Soviets liberated the ghetto on 17 January 1945.

The reputation of the Jewish Council of Budapest is controversial. According to some, the leaders tried to do everything within the framework of the extremely limited opportunities, while others accused the members of the council of betrayal and collaboration with the Nazis. Following the Communist takeover, several show trials with anti-Semitic overtones took place against the council's former board members.

== Background ==
=== Jews in Hungary ===
In the 1941 census, the population of Hungary was 14,683,323. Of these, 725,005 regarded themselves as Jews (4.94 percent) and another 100,000 were Jewish by descent who identified as Christian. Over 400,000 lived in post-Trianon Hungary and another 324,000 lived in territories acquired by Hungary since 1938: Northern Transylvania from Romania (164,000), part of Upper Hungary from Czechoslovakia (146,000), Carpathian Ruthenia (78,000), and Bácska and other areas that had been part of Yugoslavia (14,000). Under the Third Jewish Law (8 August 1941), a total of 785,555 persons were declared as Jews.

The rift between the modernist and liberal Neolog Jews and the traditionalist and conservative Orthodox Jews was institutionalized following the 1868–1869 Hungarian Jewish Congress and the Neologs became a de facto separate denomination. When faced with the need to choose between the two, a third faction of "Status quo" congregations emerged, refusing to join either and remaining fully autonomous, without a higher authority. Within the post-1941 borders in Hungary, the Orthodox had 535 religious communities (72%), followed by the Neolog with 167 communities (23%) and the Status Quo had 38 communities (5%). However, the territorial distribution was different. The Orthodox were the dominant denomination in Transylvania and Northeast Hungary, while the Neolog Jews were the majority in the territory of post-Trianon Hungary and Délvidék (Bácska and Vojvodina).

=== Jewish leadership during WW2 ===
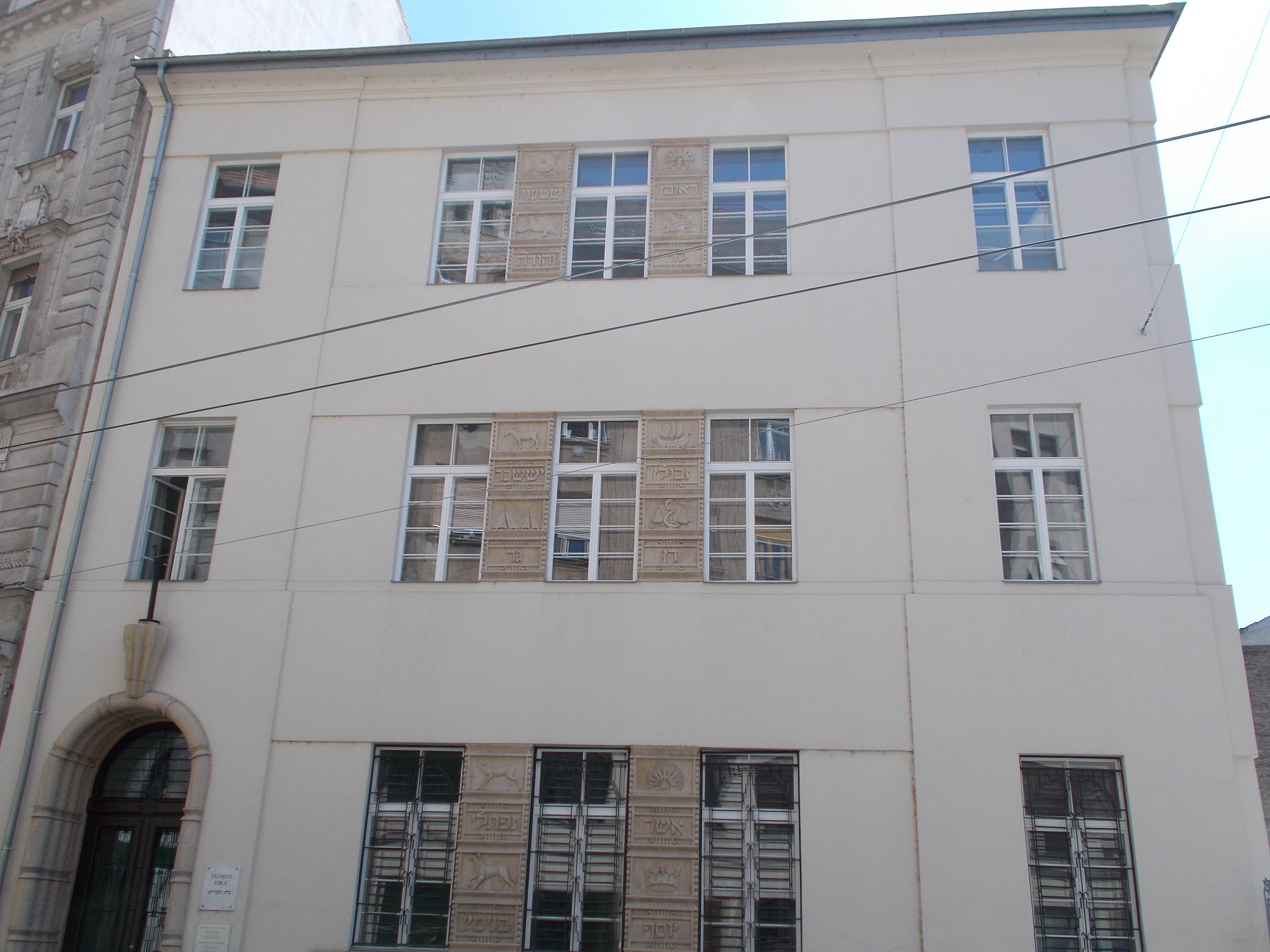
HQ of the Mazsihisz at Síp utca 12 in Budapest, also a centre of various Neolog organizations during interwar period and World War II

In Budapest, the Neolog were the dominant faction. Their organization, the Israelite Community of Pest (PIH) was chaired by banker and entrepreneur Samu Stern since December 1929. There were Neolog religious communities in Buda (Israelite Community of Buda, BIH), Óbuda and Kőbánya too. Stern was in poor health in the years before the Holocaust, thus he offered to resign several times, but the religious community was able to persuade him to stay. Beside the PIH, Stern also presided over the Neolog umbrella organization, the National Office of Israelites of Hungary (MIOI). Both organizations were headquartered at Síp utca 12. The Orthodox in Budapest were represented by the Autonomous Orthodox Community of Budapest (BAOIH), which was led by manufacturer Fülöp Freudiger since 1939, who came from an influential family in the Orthodox community. The national organization Orthodox Israelite Central Office (OIKI) was headed by Samu Kahan-Frankl. At the end of 1938, the three Jewish factions established a common social organization called Bureau for the Protection of the Rights of the Jews of Hungary (MIPI). Zionists were also eligible to delegate a voting member to its executive committee after 1939. The MIPI established its fundraising body in the autumn of 1939, under the name National Hungarian Jewish Aid Organization (OMZSA). In addition, a common Committee of War Veterans (HB) was also established, which represented the interests of the Jewish veterans of the First World War, presided over by former liberal Member of Parliament Béla Fábián. By 1944, the Jewish communities had several press products: Magyar Zsidók Lapja (Neolog), Képes Családi Lapok (Neolog), Orthodox Zsidó Újság (Orthodox) and Mult és Jövő (Zionist).

"People listened in shock. To rebel? To bind the guards? To escape? Moreover, to Romania, which is Hungary's enemy? Loyalty to the homeland – which sentenced them to labor service and worked to exterminate their family – was so instilled in them that the idea of raising hand to a Hungarian soldier shocked them."
Memoirs of Ödön Szabó (Yeshurun Eliyahu)

The rabbis supported the Horthy regime during their worship services, demonstrating their patriotism. Samu Stern stated in one of his letters to Prime Minister Miklós Kállay in July 1943 that despite the anti-Semitic "Jewish laws" and regulations, the situation of Hungarian Jews was immeasurably better compared to the communities of neighboring countries, which were being threatened with physical annihilation. Both the Neolog and Orthodox leadership, in addition to the HB, tried to ease the situation of labour service units by fundraising, collecting clothes, caring for orphans and providing legal aid to members of the units. According to historian László Bernát Veszprémy, all of this refutes the established view that the Jewish leadership was insensitive to the poor and labour service units during the war. The MIPI, despite its anti-Zionist position, increasingly tried to help those who were considering emigrating ("aliyah") to Palestine. After WW2, there were accusations that Jewish laws only affected the poor, lower classes of the Jewry, while the leadership remained untouched, and these accusations also explain the leadership's collaborative behavior later during the occupation. There were also accusations that Stern and his circle, because of their law-abiding attitudes, did not financially support Jews who had escaped to Hungary illegally from the surrounding countries (Poland and Slovakia). The American Jewish Joint Distribution Committee (JDC) claimed in late 1943 that "Hofrat [court councillor] Stern is not prepared to take part in any illegal work". Stern considered that any involvement in illegal work would have affected the Hungarian Jews negatively. In contrast to the Neolog organizations, the Orthodox organizations led by Freudiger supported the refugees with aid and supported the Working Group in Bratislava, Slovakia by "illegal" means.

"I was very, very tired by then. I had very little strength and desire to strain myself to live."
Béla Zsolt: Nine Suitcases

Following World War II, the Hungarian Jewish leadership was accused of concealing information about Nazi genocides and concentration camps from its members in the years before the German invasion of Hungary. Holocaust survivors Elie Wiesel and Ágnes Heller shared this viewpoint. Historian Mária Schmidt argued Jews were able to learn about war crimes in broad terms through the press, radio and the reports of returning forced labourers. Veszprémy argued, despite wartime censorship, many Hungarian articles dealt with certain events of the Holocaust (deportations, ghettos, pogroms and massacres) around German-occupied Europe and allied and client states (for instance, Romania, Slovakia and Croatia), even years before the German occupation. In addition, the Israelite Community of Pest, as the richest religious community in the world, maintained contact with the Jewish leadership of countries (e.g. Croatia) where concentration camps were operating and deportations took place by that time. Since 1939, Polish and Slovak Jews constantly fled to Hungary, who reported on the horrors they had experienced to the rural communities, where they were admitted. The Jewish leaders were also able to obtain information about the Kamianets-Podilskyi and Újvidék (Novi Sad) massacres, in which the Hungarian militias were already heavily involved. Ottó Komoly even mentioned both crimes in his memorandum sent to the Hungarian government in the summer of 1943. The Jews of Carpathian Ruthenia kept the MIPI informed constantly regarding the atrocities against their communities and the subsequent deportations in the Hungarian-occupied territories of the Soviet Union during the Eastern Front.

Numerous contemporary diary entries from different social strata prove that the Jews knew about the Nazi genocides elsewhere in Europe, but did not want to believe them, as a result of a kind of mass psychosis. As Ödön Szabó, a former Neolog rabbi of Békéscsaba summarized, "There is a saying that you don't believe what you have, but what you want to believe". Skepticism about the reality of the news was increased by the mistrust and opposition between the Neolog, Orthodox and Zionist groups.

== Jewish Council of Budapest ==
=== Formation ===
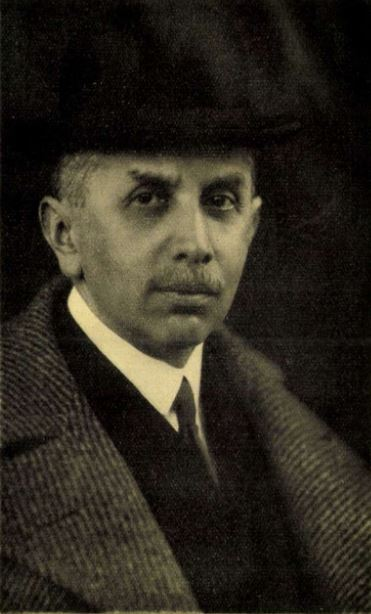
Samu Stern in 1930

Nazi Germany invaded the Kingdom of Hungary on 19 March 1944. This was a great shock for the Jewish leadership, most of them (even the Zionists) believed that the war would soon be over, and that Hungarian Jewry would have a high chance of avoiding the fate that the Germans intended for the Jewish communities of the territories they occupied. The arriving Germans, known together as the Eichmann-Kommando under the leadership of Adolf Eichmann, Hermann Krumey and Dieter Wisliceny, sought to avoid panic in the ranks of the Jewish leadership. Hours after the occupation, Schutzstaffel (SS) officers arrived at Síp utca 12, (Note: At the time of the invasion, the PIH was holding its annual general assembly, which abruptly adjourned, when news of the German invasion spread.) demanding the Neolog and Orthodox religious community leaders convene next day. The Hungarian authorities ordered the Jewish leadership to obey the German order. On the morning of 20 March, they appeared at the headquarters of the PIH, fearing arrest or massacre. There, SS-Obersturmbannführer Hermann Krumey claimed that there would be "restrictions", but there was no need to fear deportation, if a centralized Jewish leadership would cooperate. Upon their demands, the Jews presented a list of eight members of a Jewish council (Judenrat) to be set up. The PIH was represented by president Samu Stern, Ernő Boda, Ernő Pető (vice-chairs) and Károly Wilhelm (principal), while BIH also delegated its president Samu Csobádi to the council. Samu Kahan-Frankl and Fülöp Freudiger represented the Orthodox community, while Niszon Kahan became the only Zionist member of the body. Due to their negligible numbers, the Status Quo were not represented in the composition of the council.

According to Stern and Freudiger, the Jewish council was appointed by the Germans, but according to Ernő Munkácsi, the secretary-general of the PIH, the entire list was compiled by Stern. Pető and Kahan recalled that the Gestapo insisted on the Zionists' involvement in the administrative body, thus the latter became the eighth member of the council during its formation (since Komoly, the President of the Hungarian Zionist Association, refused to join). The Nazis insisted on the participation of actual community leaders from all denominations, but Stern was granted a free hand to name the specific people who would become council members. Samu Stern and his two colleagues from the PIH, Pető and Wilhelm, formed an inner circle within the council. In the absence of formal meetings, they made most immediate, emergency decisions. They all belonged to the right-wing upper middle class of those wealthy assimilated and acculturated Jews, who had dominated Neolog communities in Budapest during the interwar period. As scholar Randolph L. Braham noted the establishment of the Judenrat by the Nazi authorities, as elsewhere in Europe, was "the first step in the Final Solution", as decided by Reinhard Heydrich. Samu Stern wrote in his memoirs in 1946 that "I considered it a cowardly, unmanly and irresponsible behavior, a selfish escape and running away, if I let my fellow believers down now, right now, when leadership is needed the most, when the sacrificial work of experienced and politically connected men could perhaps help them". Stern trusted his personal connections, especially Regent Miklós Horthy, whom he had known for two decades. Munkácsi argued the Jewish leadership "lulled themselves into the unfounded optimism that we would be the exceptions, the tiny island in the sea of the destruction of European Jews". Stern and his colleagues were convinced that they could hold together the network of religious communities and aid organizations, and if they did not lead the council, then some far less competent and influential council would worsen the Jews' chances of survival.

In his memoirs written in 1947, Ernő Munkácsi divided the activity of the Jewish Council of Budapest into four parts; the first lasting from its formation on 20 March until the establishment of the Association of Hungarian Jews Provisional Executive Committee on 1 May. The second lasted until 7 July, when the deportation of the Jews of Budapest was proposed for the first time. The third part of the council's activity lasted until the Nazi-puppet Arrow Cross Party's takeover on 15 October. The fourth part covered the period of the existence of the Budapest Ghetto and the siege of the capital, approximately from 15 October 1944 to 17 January 1945, when the Jewish council was abolished. Several historians (e.g. Judit Molnár and László Bernát Veszprémy) follow this division, Molnár referred to first, second, third and fourth councils. Israeli historian Dan Michman, in contrast, argued that there is no need for distinction because of the council's political coherence in its activity throughout its existence. Historians Gábor Kádár and Zoltán Vági maintained the periodization, arguing that the operation of the "second council" was legalized by the Hungarian authorities, while the Arrow Cross Party coup and the subsequent ghetto and siege created a new situation for its activity.

=== First period ===
On 21 March 1944, the Germans accepted Stern's list, establishing the Central Council of Hungarian Jews (Magyar Zsidók Központi Tanácsa), to which jurisdiction over the whole country (i.e. national Jewish affairs) had been assigned. Stern was selected as president of the new body. Upon the demands of Krumey and Wisliceny, another meeting was convened on 28 March, which was also attended by twenty-seven rabbis and leaders from the congregation districts in countryside, mostly Neolog, but also some Orthodox, after they were granted domestic travel permits by the German administration. Krumey adopted the statutes of the council on 1 April, which were accepted by Wisliceny on 4 April. In principle, a National Grand Council (Note: Its membership was to be made up of the 25–27 members of the never existed Great Council of Budapest, the presidents of the ten Neolog district congregations, the presidents of the ten largest Orthodox and two Status quo congregations.) would have been established to consult between the metropolitan and rural councils, but this was never done due to the immediate start of rural deportations. On 31 March, Adolf Eichmann informed Stern and his deputies that he would also include converted Jews under the jurisdiction of the Central Council of Hungarian Jews, recognizing it as the only representative body of the Jewish population in Hungary, regardless their religion.

Departments of the Central Council of Hungarian Jews (April 1944)
Departments
Presidential Department

*Liaison Office with the German and Hungarian authorities
*Translation Office
*Liaison Office with the Jewish religion communities
*Press Sub-department
*Statistical and Demographic Sub-department
*Personnel Sub-department

Financial Department
Social Department
Economic and Technical Department
Education and Culture Department
Department of Foreign Affairs
Department of Religious Affairs
Housing and Travel Department
Department of Converts

At the time of the foundation the Jewish council of Budapest consisted of nine departments and six sub-departments within the presidential department (according to a draft from 1 April, see table). The Department of Foreign Affairs maintained contact with the international Zionist movement and looked for the possibility of emigration to Palestine for those who were interested. The Department of Converts was responsible for representation of the converts, who were placed under the Jewish Council of Budapest, which deepened antagonism between the two groups. Later, however, additional departments were created; Ernő Munkácsi's circular letter on 1 September was signed by 29 department heads, and another document from August lists 76 departments.

The Jewish council took over the employees of the religious communities one by one. Samu Stern estimated the number of employees at 1,800. A real bureaucratic machine was created in the first months, but the departments were often not aware of their own jurisdictions and worked parallel to each other on the same case at the same time. A memorandum complained about the lack of hierarchy and the ex lex status. A conflict of jurisdiction and subsequent reconciliation negotiations took place between the rural and social affairs departments. in the end, they agreed that collecting donations is the responsibility of the social department, while the rural department collects information about internments, deportees, and the delivery of donations (e.g. medicines) to rural areas. Many employees, who volunteered, were probably looking for protection and advantages (e.g. exemption certificates from deportations) under the auspices of the council. The council financed its activity from the budget of the PIH, without any formal legal basis. The Social Department, which was transformed from the MIPI, was initially led by István Földes, later a member of the Jewish council. Subsequently, the MIPI was re-organized (led by György Polgár, then József Pásztor), but the separation of authority between the two organizations was not clear. The Housing and Travel Department, the most active and controversial section of the council, was headed by former bank director Rezső Müller; this department employed the most staff within the council. Almost two-thirds (63%) of the 6,214 cases filed dealt with housing and related matters during the existence of the Central Council. The Education and Culture Department attempted to support Jewish actors, and it secured the Torahs and other religious objects of their communities in the rock cellar of the Adria Insurance Company in Kőbánya. Within the council, the Zionists were responsible for information and liaison with community affairs in the countryside, which received significant manpower and financial resources from Samu Stern.

After its establishment, the Central Council informed the rural Jewish councils about its jurisdiction and authority in a circular letter on 6 April 1944. Simultaneously, the establishment of the council was also announced in the Neolog newspaper Magyar Zsidók Lapja. The gazette called upon the Jewish population to keep calm, misleadingly claiming that the council was appointed by the Hungarian authorities. However, the legal status of the council was still confusing in the beginning. It was not clear whether the council replaced the religious community, or whether the two function in parallel, similar to previous Jewish organizations. The Magyar Zsidók Lapja (renamed on 27 April to Magyarországi Zsidók Lapja) was published under the censorship of Gestapo and acted as the official gazette of the Central Jewish Council. It was edited by Rezső Roóz. The paper published calm, emotionless, controlled news and articles (as the main message, "if the Jews follow the rules, there will be no problem"), which was seen by some as proof of the council's collaboration after the war. The other newspapers, the Orthodox Zsidó Újság and Mult és Jövő ceased to function during the German occupation. In addition to the accusations, Veszprémy emphasized the importance of the Magyarországi Zsidók Lapja: the warnings (e.g. no smoking, regular wearing a yellow badge) were often about protecting lives, since even minor transgressions led to internment and ultimately deportation to Auschwitz. Due to censorship, news of the deaths of rural rabbis and religious community leaders were only published in a refined manner, omitting details.

The new German-installed government led by Döme Sztójay passed a number of decrees restricting Jews in the following days. After 5 April persons declared to be Jews were obliged to wear the yellow badge. They were not allowed to travel after 7 April unless if they had received a travel permit from the Hungarian and German authorities (the employees of the Jewish council were entitled to this exemption for the purpose of carrying out their duties). On the same day, the confidential decree of the Minister of the Interior Andor Jaross first referred to the existence of the "Central Jewish Council with headquarters in Budapest". According to the decree, all Jews, regardless of gender and age had to be transported to designated internment camps. Jaross instructed the council to establish temporary hospitals at Nyíregyháza, Ungvár (today Uzhhorod, Ukraine), Munkács (today Mukachevo, Ukraine), and Máramarossziget (today Sighetu Marmației, Romania) with physicians and equipment. All of this served as preparation for the internment camps that would be created. The Jewish Council of Budapest attempted to get news about the gathering of the Jews and the situation of food and medicine supplies in the various camps. Some documents indicate that the council was informed from the very first days that internment (collection) camps were being set up in the Gendarmerie District of Kassa (today Košice, Slovakia) in mid-April 1944. They were also informed about ghettoization in Carpathian Ruthenia almost immediately. On 19 April 1944, Samu Stern and his colleagues wrote a memorandum to Sztójay, in which they requested an extraordinary investigation and applied for personal audience with the prime minister. Interestingly, the council members signed the paper on behalf of their former affiliations (e.g. Stern as president of the MIOI and Kahan-Frankl as president of OIKI). Due to restrictions on travel permits, the flow of information between Budapest and the countryside became difficult for Jews. After the war, Pető claimed that "it was not possible to communicate with the Jews in the countryside". Stern stated information came only from those who secretly fled to Budapest. Ernő Munkácsi argued that "there were hourly reports of threatening events from across the country". According to Ödön Szabó, the Central Council definitely was informed about the collection of Jews in Békéscsaba at the local tobacco factory before their deportation in June 1944. Overall, however, the Jewish councils had to function in complete isolation from each other from the very beginning, because the Jews were deprived of all means of communication (e.g. termination of telephone lines, mail censorship and travel ban) soon after the invasion of Hungary.

=== Second period ===
A ministerial decree by Andor Jaross on 22 April 1944 re-organized the Central Jewish Council as the nine-member Association of Hungarian Jews Provisional Executive Committee (Magyarországi Zsidók Szövetségének Ideiglenes Intéző Bizottsága) in effect on 8 May 1944 (but this council itself de facto came to exist by 1 May). The council members were not informed about this change in advance, and, as Munkácsi claimed, the Hungarian administration bypassed Eichmann and his staff with this decision too. Munkácsi and two council members, Pető and Kahan negotiated with ministry department head, Lajos Argalás, the next day, who declared that the Jewish council would once again come under Hungarian authority, therefore, its operating framework was "legalized" retroactively. The new regulation also involved personnel changes: Béla Berend, the chief rabbi of Szigetvár, became a member on the recommendation of Zoltán Bosnyák, the director of the anti-Semitic Jewish Question Institute. From the beginning, this created general distrust between him and Stern's circle. Some confidential documents were destroyed on Stern's orders because it was known that "Berend had entered the Jewish Council as a traitor". The Ministry of the Interior insisted on appointing a member to represent the Converts. Thus, journalist Sándor Török was appointed to the body. PIH spokesperson and attorney János Gábor became a member under pressure from the Germans, and acted as the liaison with the Eichmann-Kommando because of his excellent German language skills. The fourth new member was József Nagy, chief physician of the PIH Jewish Hospital at Szabolcs utca. Simultaneously, Ernő Boda, Samu Csobádi and Niszon Kahan left the council. Kahan, instead, became the recorder of the council. Because of Stern's illness, Samu Kahan-Frankl presided the inaugural meeting of the "second council" on 15 May 1944. They prepared the organization's statutes on May 22, but they were never approved by the Ministry of the Interior.

The council of Budapest repeatedly sent financial aid to the Jewish residents of rural ghettos (for instance, in Szombathely, Nyíregyháza and Baja). The council addressed a series of submissions regarding the ghettos and atrocities (i.e. deportations) in countryside to the Ministry of the Interior and other departments (including police and gendarmerie), because the council was not received in person. These documents were usually formulated by László Bakonyi, the secretary-general of the MIOI. These initiatives were pointless, since the council asked those bodies to investigate these atrocities, who were the initiators and executors of them. A memorandum with the date 25 May to the Regent's Cabinet Office clearly proves that the council was aware that the purpose of the deportations was to exterminate the Jews. The council was constantly preparing for the Hungarian and German authorities to order the ghettoization of Budapest's Jews, as had happened in the countryside. Music historian and OMIKE colleague Zsigmond László prepared a plan for the organization of the expected ghetto life as early as 3 May 1944. He asked this question in his paper, "Can the unbearable be made bearable? It is not possible, but it must be!"

"They were scared and confused. They believed that if they obeyed the law, nothing could happen to them. [...] I begged them to come with me, Nothing convinced them, they were convinced that it would all pass."
Memoirs of Zionist activist Mose Weiszkopf about his visit to the ghetto of Miskolc

The Zionist-dominated Rural Department was headed by Lajos Gottesman (a right-wing Zionist) and Mózes Rosenberg (member of the left-wing Hashomer Hatzair movement). They sent their emissaries and spies everywhere, reaching half of the approximately 200 ghettos in Hungary. Scattered rescue operations took place, but the passivity among the Jews in countryside was significant even then. The people of the Zionist movement had an advantage in rescues, all the more so because they could be recruited for further rescue operations. According to recollections, these agents often came face-to-face with the exempted Jewish veterans of the HB, whom many considered to be "executioners" of the Hungarian authorities. However, other HB leaders used their exceptional situation to serve their community. Council members Csobádi and Komoly were also WW1 veterans, while there were decorated veterans among sub-managers as well, for instance, Miksa Domonkos, Albert Geyer or Rezső Müller. Since the veterans did not have to wear a yellow badge, the central council often sent them to the ghettos as messengers, as Béla Fábián wrote in his memoir. Their cooperation guaranteed the limited contact that still existed between Budapest and the rural ghettos. Later, exceptionalism and veteran status no longer mattered, and many veterans were murdered or deported, especially after the Arrow Cross Party coup. The Central Jewish Council maintained relationship with the various Zionist organizations, including the Palestine Office, the HeHalutz and the Aid and Rescue Committee led by Komoly, who met members of the council on a daily basis. To save the Jews, these organizations quickly took the initiative from the Central Jewish Council beginning in early summer 1944.

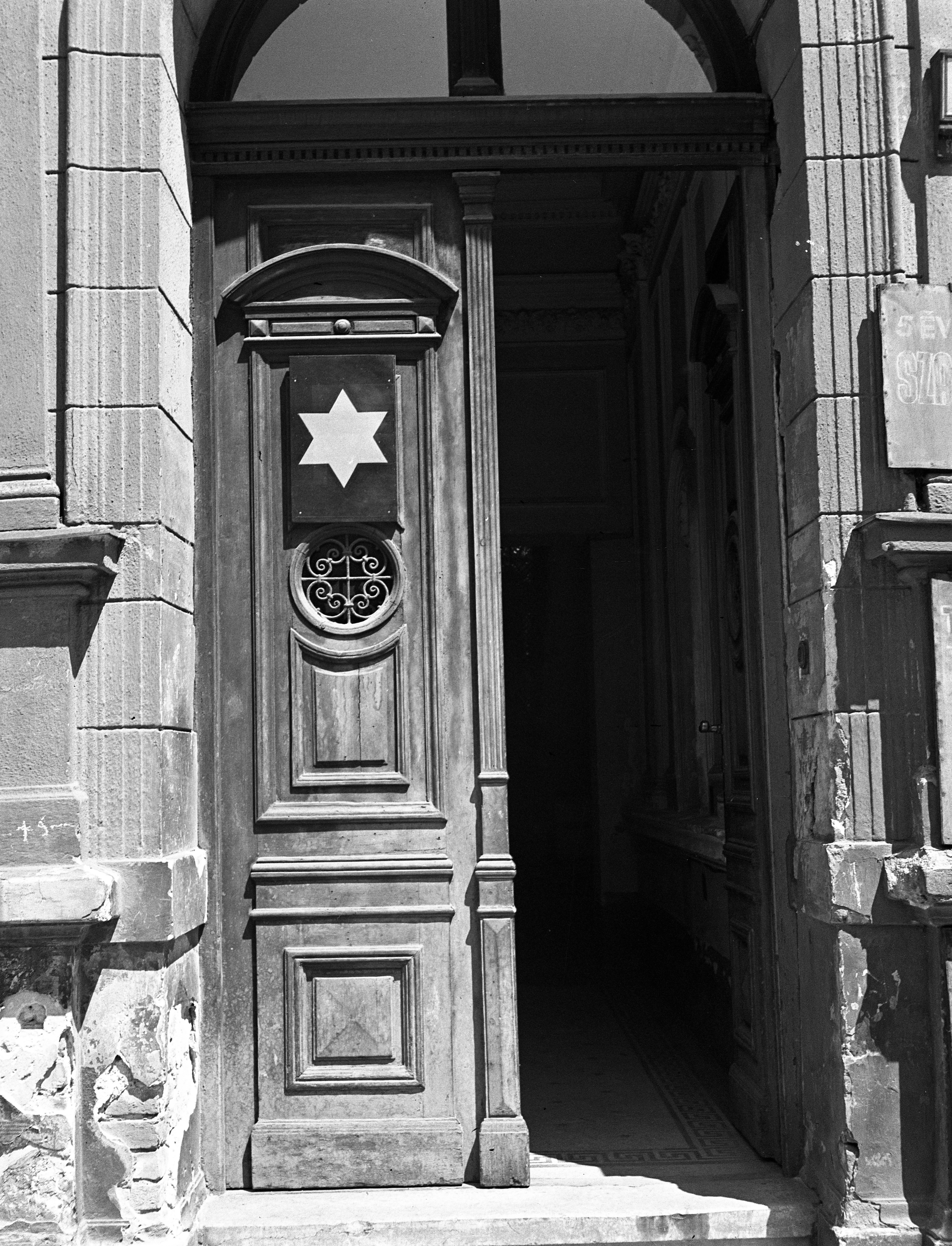
A yellow-star house in Budapest in 1944

Since the German occupation of Hungary, the Jewish Council of Budapest operated eight hospitals (the most prominent was in Szabolcs utca), but with a decreasing number of beds only the most urgent cases could be treated. The lack of equipment and doctors was a general problem and the lack of freedom of movement for doctors was also hectic. Catastrophic conditions prevailed in many old people's homes and children's homes operating under the council. The rabbis tried to distance themselves from the activities of the council even before the end of the war, as well as distance themselves from responsibility from assisting the deportations. Zsigmond Groszmann, chief rabbi of the Rabbinate of the PIH, claimed that "the Jewish Council has never asked the opinion of our Rabbinate, even in religious matters; all its activities, procedures, and measures were taken without the knowledge of our Rabbinate, as if Jewry were not a religious community."

The activity of the Housing and Travel Department was the most controversial among the functions of the central Jewish council in 1944. It was headed by a former banker and war veteran Rezső Müller, who was considered by many to be a main collaborator with the Nazis due to this office. Because of the series of Allied bombing of Budapest after 3–4 April, the mayor's office instructed the Jewish council to give 1,500 one-room, furnished, Jewish-occupied apartments to Christians who had lost their homes. The Housing and Travel Department divided the territory of Budapest to 23 main districts and 216 subdivisions to fulfill the provision. The department, which had 1,000 staff members, mapped the Jewish apartments and directed the evacuation of the properties and the relocating of the Jews. According to the post-war accusations, Müller and his department met the demands of the Germans without delay, and even exceeded the expected level. Müller pointed out that he was forced under the pressure of death threats by Gestapo. In addition to the apartments, the Germans often had quite extreme requests (e.g. pianos, luxury goods, alcohol), which the Jewish council had to fulfill.

On 16 June 1944 mayor Ákos Farkas ordered the Jews to move into specially designated yellow-star houses, a network of 1,944 designated compulsory places of residence for around 220,000 Budapest Jews until the establishment of the Budapest Ghetto on 29 November. The Housing and Travel Department was given a mandate with eight-day deadline to carry out the selection of houses and the organization of the relocation of the Jews. According to the decree, a Jewish family could have only one room, so several families were crammed together in cramped apartments. Simultaneously, the Christians moved into the vacated Jewish apartments. During the process, the Housing and Travel Department positively discriminated for its own employees. The demand far exceeded the supply, and those who could not get an apartment were accommodated in the synagogues. The department established conciliation committees to deal with conflicts within apartments. The housing requisition resulted the isolation and impoverishment of the Jews, destroying the large, contiguous Jewish community in Budapest.

=== Third period ===
Overall, the Jewish Council of Budapest was powerless in any attempt to influence events of the Holocaust in Hungary. Apart from sending memoranda, they didn't have many tools, which resulted in many Jewish intellectuals committing suicide. Fülöp Freudiger testified at the Eichmann trial that once, the Jewish Council sent a secret message to the Allies in Istanbul to bomb the railway lines in Hungary, in order to preventing the deportations. Sándor Török requested Cardinal Jusztinián Serédi to excommunicate those railway workers and gendarmes who assist in deportations. A council memorandum dated 8 June to the Sztójay Cabinet urged the suspension of deportations and recommended the Jews' active participation in physical work and labour service. The council was clearly playing to gain time, since the approach of the Soviet army was increasingly expected. Some Zionists encouraged resistance in leaflets, but found no supporters among the Jews. Samu Stern and his fellow council-members initially supported the idea, but in the end they backed off because they were afraid of collective retort. An armed resistance was a stillborn idea: most of the young and healthy Jews were forced into labor service units and no significant non-Jewish armed resistance took place in Hungary during that period. Instead, the council tried to make embassies aware of the content of the smuggled Auschwitz Protocols. Sándor Török, the Converted member of the council successfully delivered the collection of eyewitness accounts to Regent Miklós Horthy via Horthy's daughter-in-law Ilona Edelsheim-Gyulai on 3 July 1944.

This process contributed to Horthy suspending and preventing the deportation of Budapest's Jews on 7 July 1944. Historian László Bernát Veszprémy highlighted that the Central Jewish Council played a major role in the implementation of the so-called Koszorús campaign, when armor-colonel Ferenc Koszorús and the First Armour Division, under Horthy's orders, resisted the gendarmerie units and prevented the deportation of the Jews of Budapest. Koszorús blocked the roads with his army and instructed Secretary of State for the Interior László Baky to drive the gendarmes out of Budapest, who were allegedly preparing for a coup d'état against Horthy. According to Ernő Pető's recollections from 1946, Stern, Wilhelm and him held negotiations with László Ferenczy more times to implement the plan. Stern and Wilhelm confirmed this at Ferenczy's trial in the same year, although the dates were often confused. Through Zoltán Bosnyák, Béla Berend liaised Ferenczy with members of the Jewish council prior to that, as Berend recalled. Captain Leó László Lulay, Ferenczy's interpreter confirmed that these meetings had taken place. According to him, the members of the Jewish council handed over such documents to Ferenczy that caused Horthy to take "an unshakable stand against further deportations". Ferenczy testified the so-called "Baky coup" was a mere fabrication invented by Horthy's staff and the Jewish council together to prevent the deportations in Budapest. (Note: In the agglomeration around Budapest (for instance, Óbuda, Békásmegyer, Kispest, Újpest and Kistarcsa) however, the Jews were deported.) The plan was drafted in the apartment of Samu Stern. Other historians doubt the veracity of the Koszorús campaign.

During the third period of the council, there were a few changes in the composition of the board. Sándor Török left the council, because of the establishment of a separate organization for the Converted Christians. Samu Kahan-Frankl decided to go into hiding in mid-July. Former member Niszon Kahan left Hungary aboard the Kastner train by that time. Ernő Boda returned to the Jewish council on 22 July. A lace manufacturer, Lajos Stöckler was also appointed to the body on 27 July. He previously had no role in Jewish community life. In a matter of weeks, Stöckler gained such influence that he challenged the secret triumvirate formed by Stern, Pető and Wilhelm. According to Randolph L. Braham, he became an advocate of the poorer and "little unprotected" Jewish strata within the central council. Unlike other council members, he wore the yellow badge.

In the upcoming weeks, Miklós Horthy kept promising Edmund Veesenmayer, the Reich plenipotentiary in Hungary, and the collaborationist Ministry of the Interior that the deportations would continue, but he always pushed back the deadlines. According to Veszprémy, a mock plan was drawn up, with the cooperation of the Jewish council, that the Jews of Budapest would be gathered in internment camps beyond the city limits. Beside Stern and his colleagues, Ottó Komoly also took part in the negotiations throughout in August 1944. This plan served to bide time until the Red Army crossed the country's border. This dangerous plan caused serious controversy within the council. Ernő Boda, an old-new member of the council, strongly opposed the activity of Stern, Pető and Wilhelm in this case. Stern personally negotiated with Horthy in early September. Both Stern and Berend recalled that Ferenczy actively participated in the process, which served to deceive the Germans. Stern later dissuaded the regent from this plan, because concentrating the Jews in one place would have made it easier for the Gestapo to deport or annihilate them, as Pető and Stern remembered. Wilhelm argued, however, that Horthy abandoned the plan under the pressure of Franklin D. Roosevelt. By late August, Ottó Komoly and Rudolf Kastner also opposed the plan. According to Béla Berend, general distrust between the council and Horthy's staff (mainly the gendarmes Ferenczy and Lulay) ended this project.

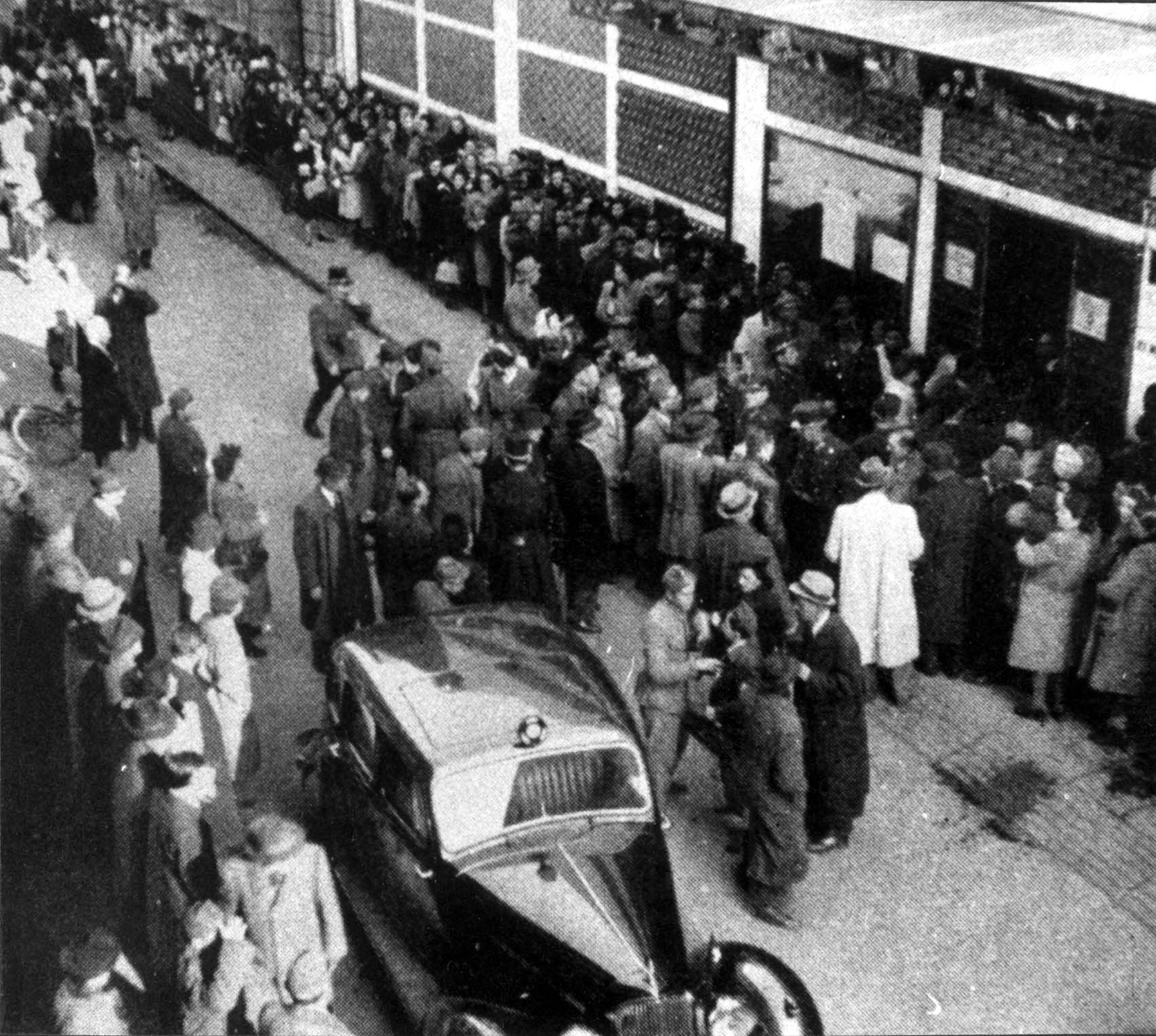
Jews wait for protective passports at the Glass House in 1944

Adolf Eichmann and his staff, exceptionally during the history of the Holocaust in Hungary, carried out the deportations in Kistarcsa as the sole executors, without the cooperation of the Hungarian authorities. The Social Department of the Jewish Council was permitted by the Ministry of the Interior to feed and supply the internment camps around Budapest (for instance, in Kistarcsa and Csepel). The employees of the council managed to place some children from Kistarcsa under the protection of the International Committee of the Red Cross. The Jewish council communicated with these internment camps via liaison officials, such as István Hahn, who often smuggled medicines, documents and equipment into the camps. Council member József Nagy and his medical team were mandated to visit the camps and care for the sick. István Vasdényey, the commander of the Kistarcsa camp informed the Jewish council on 12 July that, despite the opposition of the Hungarian authorities, the Germans put more than 1,000 prisoners of the camp on a train and were preparing to deport them. Ernő Pető sent a complaint to Miklós Horthy Jr., who informed his father. Upon the order of Regent Miklós Horthy, Captain Leó Lulay and his unit caught up with the train at Hatvan and brought it back to Kistarcsa. However, on 19 July, SS-Hauptsturmführer Franz Novak and his men returned to the camp and managed to deport 1,220 prisoners, while the Nazi authorities summoned all members of the Jewish council. Fülöp Freudiger met with Adolf Eichmann, expressing his protest. Eichmann laughed at him and later decided to kill him because of the events in Kistarcsa and the resistance of the Jewish council. Freudiger was informed of this. Using a fake Romanian passport, Freudiger, his family and escorts (altogether 80 people) escaped to Palestine via Romania on 10 August 1944 in coordination with high-ranking SS officer Dieter Wisliceny. Following his escape, another council member János Gábor was arrested and deported. He died in the Freiberg subcamp in April 1945. With Freudiger's departure, there were no Orthodox members left on the council. According to Kádár and Vági, the Orthodox members did not share the "legalist" attitude of the Neolog members and "were quicker to adapt to the new circumstances and to choose illegality".

In the second half of September 1944, now under the premiership of Géza Lakatos in a more optimistic situation, the Central Jewish Council attempted to contact the Hungarian Front, an illegal anti-fascist resistance network of banned parties and organizations. Stern claimed that they even provided financial aid to the organization.

=== Fourth period ===
In October 1944, Horthy negotiated a cease-fire with the Soviets and ordered Hungarian troops to lay down their arms. In response, Nazi Germany launched the covert Operation Panzerfaust which took Horthy into "protective custody" in Germany and forced him to abdicate on 15 October 1944. Ferenc Szálasi was made "Leader of the Nation" and prime minister of the Arrow Cross-dominated Government of National Unity the same day. László Ferenczy was made plenipotentiary responsible for Jewish affairs. He prompted the Jewish Council of Budapest to re-organize. Following the Arrow Cross Party's coup, the council was largely inactive for the next ten days. The new council consisted of president Samu Stern, his deputy Lajos Stöckler, and members Béla Berend, István Földes, Ottó Komoly, József Nagy, Miklós Szegő (from Székesfehérvár) and Lajos Vas (rabbi of the Páva Street Synagogue, although due to his serious illness, he was only a formal member). Ernő Pető and Károly Wilhelm went into hiding, therefore, their participation was omitted. Soon, Samu Stern followed them. They were informed that Ferenczy wanted to arrest and kill all three of them, because they knew compromising things about him in the eyes of the Germans. Therefore, after 28 October, Stöckler acted as de facto chair of the body, but Stern remained the nominal head of the Jewish Council of Budapest. Beside that, Miksa Domonkos, head of the Economic and Technical Department also emerged as one of the most prominent and efficient Jewish leaders in the final stages of the Holocaust, although formally he was not a member of the Jewish council.

Immediately after the Operation Panzerfaust, Eichmann's team agreed with Szálasi to deport 50,000 Jews for forced labor in Germany. This started on 20 October in collection camps all over Budapest (e.g. the KISOK sports field in Zugló, Tattersalls, the Dózsa György Street Synagogue, a brick factory in Óbuda, and the Józsefváros railway station). The Jewish council, under the leadership of József Nagy, was only able to save some people from deportation by having doctors declare them incapable of work. The council tried to communicate with the Arrow Cross Party government in submissions and in person, without any success.

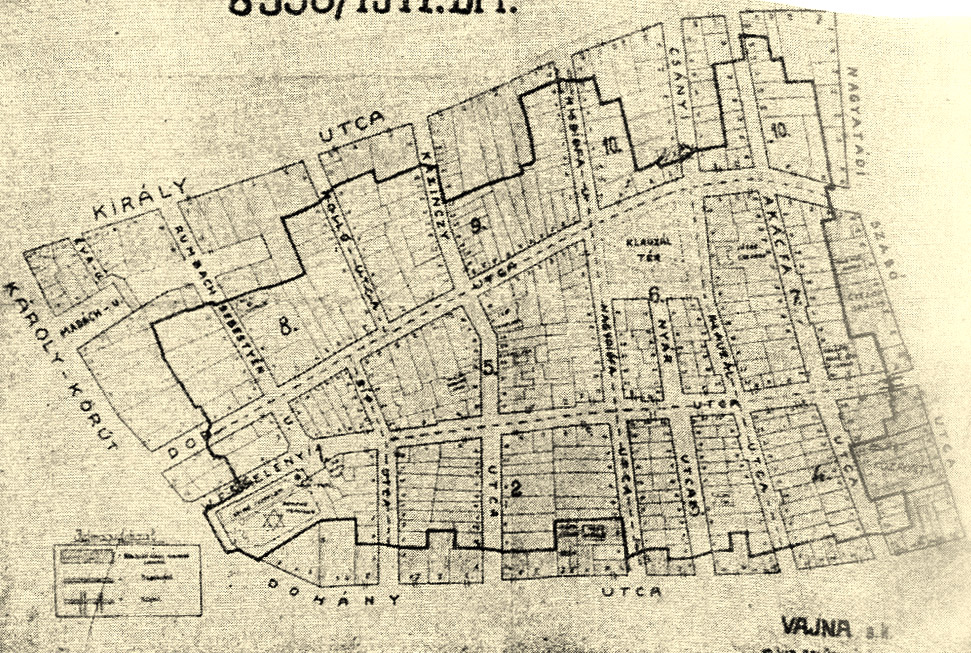
Area of the ghetto by decree of Gábor Vajna (1944)

The Szálasi government decided to establish the Budapest Ghetto. The area of the ghetto was determined by the decree of Interior Minister Gábor Vajna on 29 November 1944. Consequently, approximately 60,000 Jews were moved into a 0,26 square km zone. Vajna entrusted police chief inspector János Solymosi to supervise the relocation of the Jews. Miksa Domonkos became the actual "mayor" of the Budapest Ghetto, who sought to assert some legal authority. He was in contact with the ailing Stern and Wilhelm and knew where they were hiding, in a cellar. He attempted to establish a hierarchy to organize life within the ghetto. Administrative work continued at Síp utca 12, but to a much more limited extent. Most records contain negotiations over requests, food purchases, complaints between Solymosi and members of the council, mostly Stöckler and Földes. Meanwhile, the strategic bombing by the Allies was taking place and the center of the Jewish council was hit by several bombs.

The Jewish council was mandated to organize the administrative divisions of the Budapest Ghetto. They established 10 districts and appointed a prefect and two deputies to each of them. The prefects were responsible for food, cleaning, building shelters and fire protection. The Jewish council also organized an ambulance service led by heart surgeon Imre Littmann. A Jewish ghetto police was also established, commanded by WW1 veteran Miklós Szirt to start and then from 28 December, Ernő Szalkai. It was subordinate to the Hungarian Police and the number of personnel varied between 700–900 during the ghetto's one and a half-month existence. The ghetto police also had an investigative body, whose task was to prevent the spread of rumors and monitor the mood of the population. Council member Béla Berend exercised supervisory authority over the board, according to the surviving documents, he also gave instructions to Szirt and then to Szalkai. Through Berend and Lajos Gottesman, the Zionists were over-represented in the management of the police board. The main task of the ghetto police was to prevent German and Arrow Cross Party invaders, but for this they had only rudimentary equipment (white armbands, sticks, helmets) and against militias equipped with firearms, they could only rely on their goodwill. In January 1945, Domonkos warned the ghetto police that the wearing of the yellow badge and the curfew also applied to them. Members of the police received some privileges, e.g. there was an extra food ration, but the amount was not in line with the life-threatening nature of their activity. They also managed the digging of mass graves within the territory of the ghetto; the Klauzál Square became the ghetto's central mass grave; funerals were often celebrated by Domonkos or Berend. By early January 1945, many members of the ghetto police sabotaged their work or took part in looting the ruins themselves. On 5 January, Szalkai made a proposal to replace the majority of the police force. Unlike in Poland or the Baltic states, the ghetto police in Budapest were not used in atrocities against Jews.

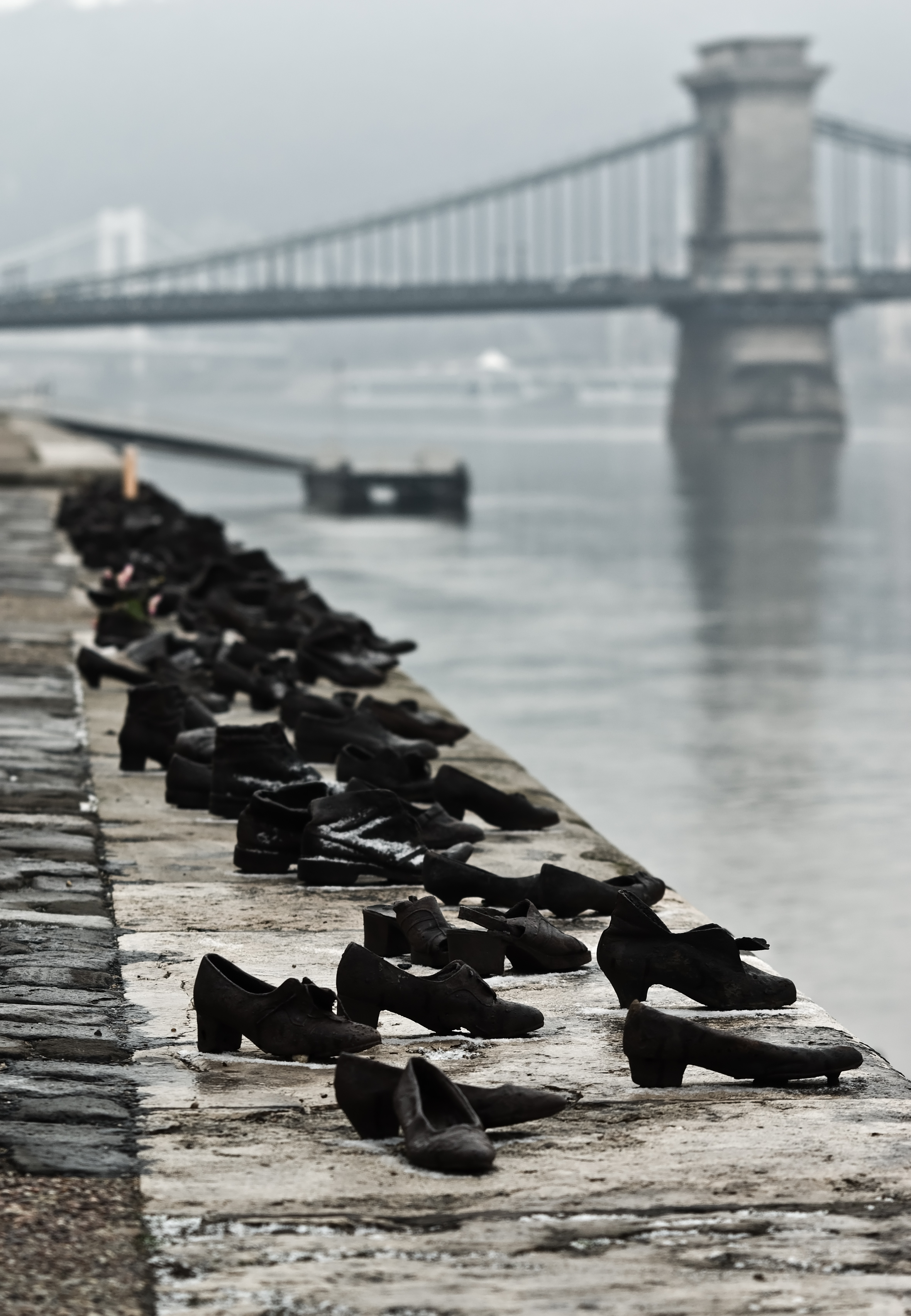
Shoes on the Danube Bank memorial on the east bank of the Danube in Budapest

The Jewish council spent heavy sums on food, clothes and fuel for the ghetto. The council was able to obtain cooking oil even when the entire population of Budapest was in need due to the siege. The extermination of rats and the cleaning of the premises continued, but the sanitary conditions were disastrous because of a lack of clean, flowing water. Within the council, Ottó Komoly was responsible for feeding and caring for children. He sought to place the children in various orphanages outside the ghettos. However, due to the siege, in several cases these children were left on their own, where they became victims of epidemics and starvation. The hospitals operated without electricity once the siege began. Due to overcrowding, the council designated apartments as "hospitals", but due to the lack of doctors, care was interrupted in many places. Infant mortality was very high. At Síp utca 12, the Goldmark hall functioned as a sick room too, where 300 people were lying in it at the same time in terrible conditions. Miklós Szegő intended to establish patient rooms per house, organized childcare and epidemic hospital, but there was no time or opportunity for that. Béla Berend visited shelters in Catholic guise to celebrate services. He even urged the leaders of the Arrow Cross Party to prevent robberies and murders and protect the ghetto area with disciplined party members. At the end of the letter, he promised that after the war all Jews will leave Hungary.

During the siege of Budapest, the administration of the ghetto quickly became impossible, garbage collection ceased, the dead were not buried and lay in the streets, and diseases spread. Domonkos described the ghetto as "Dante's Inferno". During their three-month rule in Budapest, the Arrow Cross Party death squads killed as many as 15,000 Jews. Most of the murders along the edge of the Danube took place around December 1944 and January 1945, when the Arrow Cross militia abducted the Jews from the ghetto and executed them along the river bank. Their men also looted and broke into the apartments and hospitals, and numerous massacres took place within the walls of the ghetto. These atrocities also affected the Jewish leadership. On 1 January 1945, Ottó Komoly was abducted by militia members, his body was never recovered. Miklós Szegő was also murdered sometime around 4–6 January. Other prominent employees of the Jewish council killed include Hugó Csergő and Artúr Weisz, the director of the Glass House.

Pál Szalai, the Arrow Cross Party's police liaison, testified that Adolf Eichmann planned to massacre all of the Jews in the Budapest Ghetto and said he learned about it from Domonkos. The only one who could stop it was the man given the responsibility to carry the massacre out, the commander of the German troops in Hungary, Major General Gerhard Schmidhuber. Through Szalai, Raoul Wallenberg sent Schmidhuber a note promising that he would make sure the general was held personally responsible for the massacre and that he would be hanged as a war criminal when the war was over. The general knew that the war would be over soon and that the Germans were losing. As a result the planned massacre never took place.

The first Red Army units reached the border of the ghetto on 17 January 1945, and they liberated it by breaking down the walls. The Jewish Council of Budapest ceased its operation the same day, although some cases continued to be filed in the following weeks.

=== Composition ===
After World War II there were accusations that if the central council had had rural members events could have turned out differently. During its existence the council had 17 members. Of them, however, only eight were born in Budapest. (Note: Regarding the secondary leadership (department heads and secretary-general Ernő Munkácsi, altogether 14 persons), only five were born in Budapest.) On the other hand, the overrepresentation of Transdanubians was more significant (including Stern and his two deputies, Ernő Boda and Ernő Pető). Neolog Jews were somewhat overrepresented in comparison to the Orthodox Jews (76–17 percent) regarding the national proportions, but less so with regard to the proportions of Budapest's Jews (73–27 percent). In addition, the separation between the communities was not so sharp: Niszon Kahan was a superior of the PIH, but functioned as gabbai at the Orthodox synagogue at Kazinczy utca. Although, Béla Berend graduated from Neolog rabbinic seminar, he came from a poor "Galicianer" Orthodox family. In contrast to the accusations, anti-Zionism (the ban on emigration) was also much less pronounced; apart from Niszon Kahan and Ottó Komoly, Miklós Szegő and Béla Berend were also involved in the Zionist movement to some extent. The wife of József Nagy was a well-known donor to the Zionist movement too.

The occupations of the leaders reflected the structure of typical Jewish occupations (jurists, industrialists, merchants, rabbis), therefore, the lack of manual laborers cannot be blamed as suggested in Communist-era historiography. The members of the council covered all sides of the political sphere, and, despite late allegations of right-wing or far-right sympathies (e.g. in the case of Samu Stern and Béla Berend), the council had left-wing members too. During the Hungarian Soviet Republic (1919), István Földes was a member of the Communist directorate in Pest-Pilis-Solt-Kiskun County and thus he was expelled from the bar association and returned from emigration only in 1925. Samu Csobádi also served as an attorney of the Revolutionary Military Council during the short-lived Communist state.

Members of the Jewish Council of Budapest
Name	Birth	Profession	Community	Death	First (Note: 20 March 1944 – 1 May 1944, under the name Central Council of Hungarian Jews)	Second (Note: 1 May 1944 – 7 July 1944, under the name Association of Hungarian Jews Provisional Executive Committee)	Third (Note: 7 July 1944 – 15 October 1944)	Fourth (Note: 15 October 1944 – 17 January 1945)
Samu Stern; President	1874, Nemesszalók	Banker	Neolog	1946, Budapest	X	X	X	X (Note: de jure, Stern hid after the Operation Panzerfaust, because he was informed that László Ferenczy wanted to kill him.)
Béla Berend	1911, Budapest	rabbi	Neolog	1987, New York City		X (Note: He became a member on the recommendation of Zoltán Bosnyák, director of the anti-Semitic Jewish Question Institute.)	X	X
Ernő Boda	1887, Pári	jurist	Neolog	1967, Budapest	X		X	
Samu Csobádi	1879, Csobád	jurist	Neolog	1964, Budapest	X			
István Földes	1882, Budapest	jurist	Neolog	1953, Budapest				X
Fülöp Freudiger	1900, Budapest	manufacturer	Orthodox	1976, Bnei Brak	X	X	X (Note: He fled to Romania, along with his family and other Orthodox Jews in August 1944.)	
János Gábor	1899, Budapest	jurist	Neolog	1945, Freiberg subcamp (Note: He was arrested and deported by the Germans following the escape of Freudiger.)		X (Note: He joined the council under pressure from the Germans, and acted as a liaison because of his excellent German language skills.)	X	
Niszon Kahan	1883, Lemberg	jurist	Zionist	1949, Haifa	X		(Note: He left Hungary on the board of the Kastner train on 30 June 1944.)	
Samu Kahan-Frankl	1890, Máramarossziget	rabbi	Orthodox	1970, New York City	X	X	(Note: He hid before German authorities in mid-July 1944.)	
Ottó Komoly	1892, Budapest	engineer	Zionist	1945, Budapest (Note: He was abducted and murdered by militia members of the Arrow Cross Party on 1 January 1945.)				X
József Nagy	1890, Budapest	physician	Neolog	1955, Budapest		X	X	X
Ernő Pető	1882, Nemesvámos	jurist	Neolog	1968, São Paulo	X	X	X	
Lajos Stöckler	1897, Budapest	manufacturer	Neolog	1960, Sydney			X	X (Note: de facto President)
Miklós Szegő	1887, Mór	landowner	Neolog	1945, Budapest (Note: He was murdered by militia members of the Arrow Cross Party on 4 or 6 January 1945.)				X
Sándor Török	1904, Homoróddaróc	journalist	Convert	1985, Budapest		X (Note: He became a member on the recommendation of far-right politician Ferenc Rajniss.)	(Note: He left the organization on 14 July 1944, when a separate Association of Christian Jews of Hungary was established.)	
Lajos Vas	1882, Budapest	entrepreneur	Neolog	1948, Budapest				X (Note: de jure, he was an inactive member due to his prolonged illness.)
Károly Wilhelm	1886, Kassa	jurist	Neolog	1951, Zürich	X	X	X	

== Jewish councils in the countryside ==
=== General characteristics ===
In April 1944, a total of 740 Jewish religious communities were registered throughout Hungary (representatives of more than one community were present in several towns). Immediately after the invasion, German authorities arrested many wealthy Jews in countryside, and, treating them as hostages, demanded ransom and tribute for them. Several reports of this action reached the Jewish council of Budapest, but they were powerless to do anything. These sums and valuables (usually jewelry or luxury items) were often collected through the newly established Jewish councils.

Historian László Bernát Veszprémy identified 154 councils in the countryside (20.8% of the religious communities). These councils were created in different ways in the days following the German invasion. In some places, they were created directly by the German occupying authorities, in other places the local mayor and police (i.e. the Hungarian bureaucracy) gave the instructions to do so in accordance with the decree of 1520/1944 M. E. regarding "Jewish municipalities", which had granted national powers to the central council, but was often interpreted locally as requiring the creation of Jewish councils at the local level as well. In most cases, the leaders and superiors of the local religious communities became the presidents of the established councils, almost automatically, i.e. these religious communities were transformed themselves into Jewish councils (Judenräte). Some leaders, citing health reasons, did not accept the position and retired (e.g. Ármin Zollner in Balatonfüred and Emil Lenkei in Esztergom), while others (e.g. Dezső Vida in Mohács) committed suicide. However, most of them accepted the role because they hoped that they would be able to ease the situation of their community. Several Jewish leaders were forced to assist under the threat of physical abuse or death. For instance, József Fischer in Kolozsvár (today Cluj-Napoca, Romania) was repeatedly beaten and abused during his operation by local Gestapo men and the Hungarian police. The members of council in Pécs were threatened with execution, and shown the trees in front of the synagogue where they would be hanged if they resisted. Some examples of defiance are known, though: Imre Wesel in Szombathely refused the local SS officer's private demands of luxury goods for which he was deported in May 1944. Lajos Sichermann, a member of the council in Iza (present day Ukraine) protested the abuse of women in the local ghetto, for which he was shot dead.

The period of existence of the Jewish councils varied across the country. For instance, the council in Újvidék (present-day Novi Sad, Serbia), existed for only four days (25–29 April 1944), while the one in Esztergom lasted for 75 days. Most of the councils ceased after the deportations ended at the location in question. The last Jewish council was established in Arad on 13 September 1944, when the 3rd Hungarian Army briefly occupied the city following the Romanian coup d'état. However the advancing Soviet–Romanian armies defeated them at the Battle of Păuliș, also result the abolition of the council after six days, saving local Jews from deportation. Of the 154 known councils, the presidents of 113 are known by name. Among them, the affiliation of 80 leaders is known – 43 Neolog (54%), 30 Orthodox (37.5%), 6 Status Quo (7.5%) and 1 Converted Christian (1%). There were also supporters of the Zionist movement in the leaderships of some councils, for instance, in Kolozsvár (József Fischer), Székesfehérvár (Miklós Szegő), Nagyvárad (Sándor Leitner, a Mizrachi) and Kassa (Artúr Görög). Before the German occupation, 58 of the 80 were active leading members of the local religious communities (presidents, vice-presidents or district heads); 29 Neolog (50%), 25 Orthodox (43.1%) and 4 Status quos (6.89%). 11 presidents of the Jewish councils were rabbis (8 Neolog, 2 Orthodox and one Status quo). In 101 cases, the occupation is also known (31 merchants, 21 jurists, 12 rabbis and religion teachers etc.). Politically, the Jewish leadership in countryside was also a heterogeneous group: Róbert Pap of Szeged was a Civic Radical Party (PRP) politician in his youth, while Ödön Antl of Kaposvár was a member of the Independent Smallholders' Party (FKGP). Artúr Görög was considered a right-wing Zionist.

The drastically changed situation reconciled the different communities in most cases as they recognized their common interests and the necessity of cooperation. However, the forced amalgamation by Nazi authorities still caused some tension in some settlements, which were also burdened by personal contradictions. The councils were formed so quickly that initially there was confusion in terms of names and jurisdictions, in many cases the councils still referred to themselves as religious communities. Councils appointed by Nazis often took German names (especially in Western Hungary).

=== Regional councils ===
In accordance with the decree of 1520/1944 M. E., the newly created councils contacted the central council seated in Budapest one after the other. According to some sources, there were also regional Jewish councils. The first was established in Győr by the German administration shortly after the occupation of Hungary. It was headed by timber merchant János Biringer, who, with the intention of establishing local Jewish councils, convened religious assemblies in Érsekújvár (today Nové Zámky, Slovakia) and Veszprém too. Biringer's jurisdiction extended to the "provisionally and administratively unified counties of Győr–Moson–Pozsony", the "provisionally and administratively unified counties of Nyitra-Pozsony", the "provisionally and administratively unified counties of Bars-Hont", Komárom, Esztergom and Vas counties.

Miklós Szegő, president of the Jewish council of Székesfehérvár, was also entrusted with abolishing the religious communities throughout the region, in Fejér and Somogy counties. In their place, Szegő organized and installed Jewish councils with the mandate of the SS officials, in Bicske, Sárkeresztúr and Szabadhídvég among other places. It is possible that Róbert Pap, head of the council in Szeged, also headed a regional council; in a letter, Gyula Virányi, the secretary-general of the religious community (later council) in Kecskemét asked for his intercession to free their president, the interned Lajos Vajda. Later Virányi was also interned and deported. Thereafter, Dezső Schönberger was appointed head of the local council in Kecskemét by the Jewish Central Council of Budapest on 21 April, which itself objected to the existence of regional councils and the designation of authority of Biringer and Szegő. Nevertheless, the deportations that took place over some weeks withered these councils quickly.

=== Roles in ghettos ===
On the instructions of the Hungarian public administration on 4 April (decree of 6136/44), the Jewish councils had to enumerate the Jewish population by settlements. Zoltán Bosnyák, director of the anti-Semitic and infamous Jewish Question Institute supervised this process. These lists were later used significantly during deportations by German authorities and the Hungarian Royal Gendarmerie. On 7 April, Ernő Pető, a member of the central council, instructed the local religious communities to make statements about their financial status, at the demand of the Germans. These declarations played a role in the looting of religious communities at the same time as the deportations.

The ghettoization of Jews was ordered on 28 April 1944, but in some places this process had already started in the previous weeks. Secretary of State for the Interior László Endre ordered the mayors and chief magistrates to start the expropriation of Jewish apartments and the relocation of Jewish families even before the relevant decrees were issued. According to some memoirs, the Jewish councils also played a role in setting up the ghettos, who had to organize the logistical background. The councils mostly communicated with the population in the ghetto through wall notices, which contained information of hierarchy, warnings and promulgation of regulations. Beside wall posters, some councils also published short-lived gazettes, such as Munkácsi Zsidótanács Közleményei in Munkács (present-day Mukachevo, Ukraine) and Kassai Zsidó Tanács Közleményei in Kassa. Elsewhere, these notification tools were banned by local authorities, like in Miskolc.

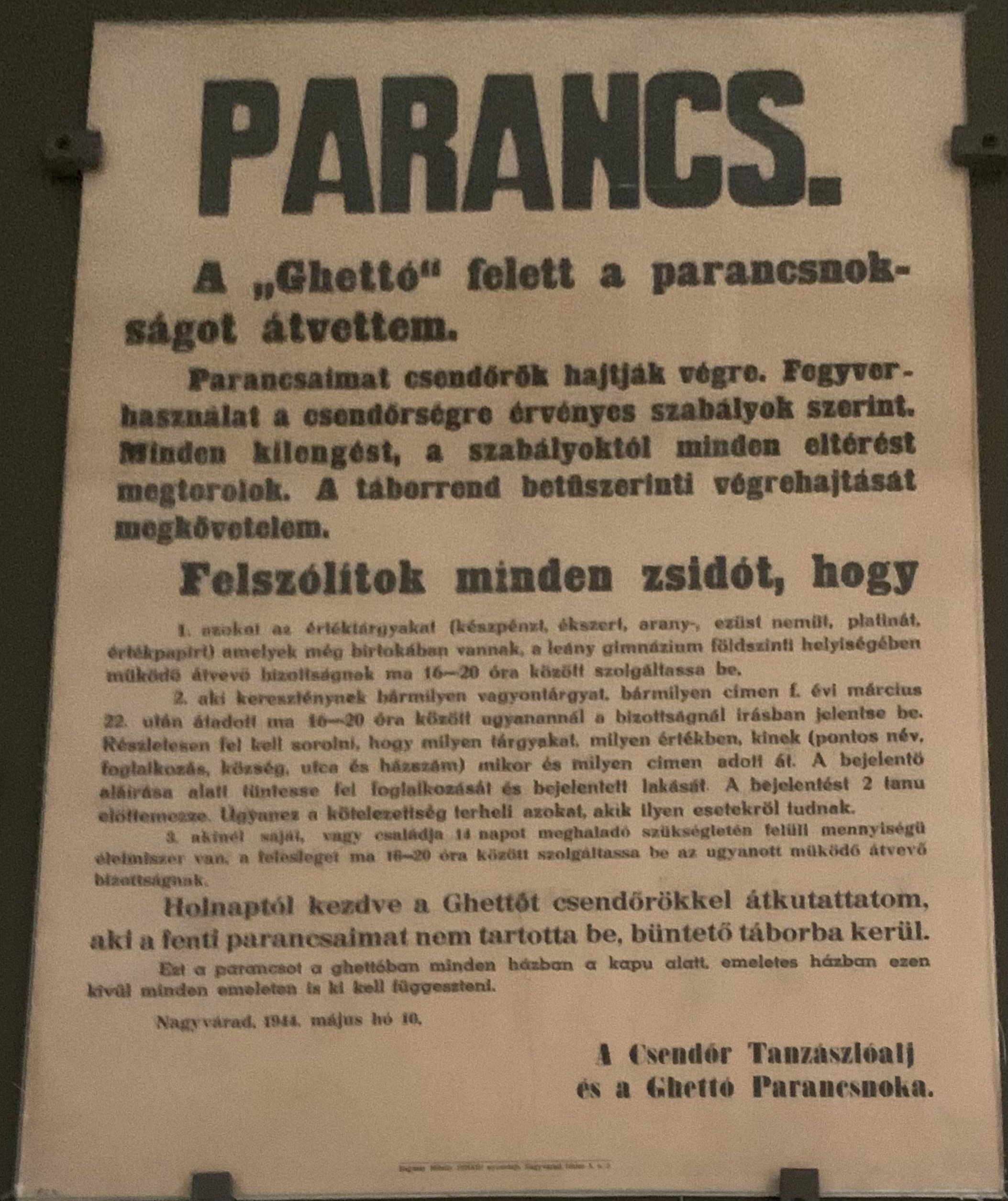
Decree of Lt. Col. Jenő Péterffy, commander of the Nagyvárad Ghetto (today Oradea, Romania)

In ghettos, Jewish councils were obliged to organize community life. They were responsible for catering, procurement of medicines, establishment and operation of internal law enforcement (Jewish Ghetto Police). All their tasks were handled through the local government office or the police (or gendarmerie), usually in the form of requests and complaints. One of their most frequent requests was to expand the floor area of the ghetto. The council in Mezőtúr successfully lobbied for this, but the council in Székesfehérvár – where the system of yellow-star houses was introduced instead of a ghetto – unsuccessfully tried to bribe the authorities to Jews could move to larger apartments. The situation depended on the goodwill of the local Hungarian authorities. In some ghettos it was possible to send letters and parcels (e.g. Debrecen), in others it was strictly forbidden (Mátészalka or Nagyvárad). Censorship of letters was prescribed in Kőszeg, but this was sabotaged by the local police. There were ghettos where the Jews moving in could take their furniture, blankets, etc. with them, but elsewhere they were allowed nothing but the clothes they were wearing. The councils often begged for extra food from the local authorities. György Kaposváry, the mayor of Kaposvár, delivered tons of food to the local ghetto at the municipality's own expense, but the bureaucracy in Szombathely prevented the delivery of milk to children and pregnant mothers in the ghetto. In many places, if anyone at all, only members of the Jewish council were allowed to leave the ghetto area, so the procurement of food and medicine fell on these few people. In some places, likeTab, the local Hungarian authorities implemented a "request" for work (mostly agricultural work) from the ghettos, where the requested number of people had to be provided by the Jewish councils. In Pécs, the council unsuccessfully petitioned for garbage removal, operation of the postal service, establishment of a playground.

The Jewish councils organized complete structures to administer life in the ghettos. In Ungvár (present-day Uzhhorod, Ukraine), the local council had a 65-member office, six departments, various sub-departments and a hospital. The distribution of apartments also fell to the councils; in this process they were often accused of partiality. According to Veszprémy's research, however, this was not a general trend, council members and heads of offices and their families were often forced to share a room with several other families too. Sándor Leitner, head of the council in Nagyvárad, noted in an ironic tone that "there was an equalization between the [social] classes that no socialist scientist could ever even dream of" in the main Nagyvárad Ghetto of 27,000 residents. Béla Zsolt also wrote, describing the same ghetto, that prosecutors, judges, workers, vagabonds were miserable together on the floor of the Orthodox synagogue before their deportation. The local Jewish councils operated hospitals in Nagyvárad, Szászrégen (today Reghin, Romania), Tata, Nagyszőlős (today Vynohradiv, Ukraine), Nyíregyháza and Baja, among others. In many places, Jewish councils were committed to maintaining a life of faith. Services were held until the deportations began in Kolozsvár Ghetto as well as in Veszprém, Eger, Kisvárda, Győr and Máramarossziget (present-day Sighetu Marmației, Romania).

The decree of 1520/1944 M. E. established the Jewish police in the ghettos too. These units were non-legally supported law enforcement agencies that supervised the internal order of the ghettos and concentration camps and controlled entry and exit. They were under the supervision of local police or gendarmerie stations. Like councils, the local Jewish police units evolved in various ways, established by either the Jewish council itself, or the Hungarian administration or Hungarian police. In the ghetto of Kaposvár, the Jewish ghetto police even had detectives and a judicial court was also appointed. Otherwise, their equipment consisted of sticks at most. There were hundreds of members of the Jewish police in Mátészalka and Ungvár. Unlike in other countries, the Jewish police in Hungary did not take part in the deportations, in many cases, their organization could not even develop due to the short time frame of their existence.

=== Deportations and disappearances ===
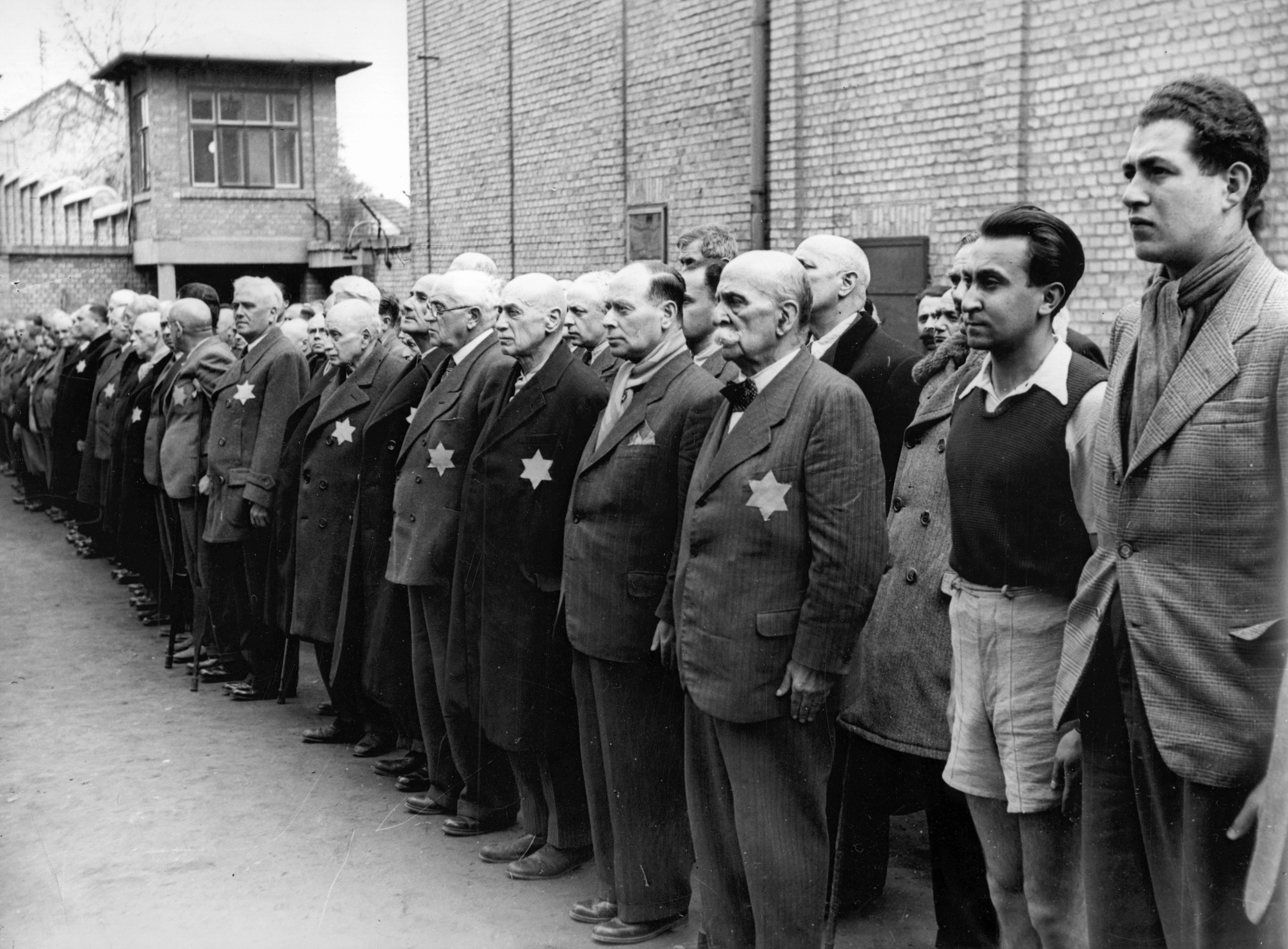
Jews in Kistarcsa internment camp in May 1944

The Jews were gradually transferred from ghettos to internment camps, the most infamous was in Kistarcsa, before their deportation to the Auschwitz concentration camp. Under the guidance of Hermann Krumey, the first train left Kistarcsa on 28 April 1944 carrying 1,800 men and women aged 16–50 who were deemed fit to work. In most internment camps, Jewish councils no longer functioned, but there were exceptions. Unlike in Poland or the Baltic states, the Jewish councils in Hungary did not participate in the selection of prisoners, but in some cases this could be done to a limited extent. In the internment camps of Szeged, Szolnok (a sugar factory) and Kolozsvár (a brick factory), the members of the councils were obliged to select among the deportees who would be sent to Auschwitz and who would be sent to Budapest or Strasshof, where the chance of survival was greater (about 75 percent of 21,000 Hungarian Jews deported to Strasshof survived due to an agreement between the Aid and Rescue Committee of Budapest and Adolf Eichmann). By 9 July 1944, 434,351 Jews had been deported in 147 trains, according to László Ferenczy of the Hungarian Royal Gendarmerie. According to Edmund Veesenmayer, the Reich plenipotentiary in Hungary, the figure was 437,402. By the beginning of summer (late May or early June), the system of Jewish councils ceased to exist in the countryside.

Lipót Löw, a Neolog rabbi and member of the council in Szeged, recalled that they received a letter from the local SS official on 20 June, in which Zionist leader Ernő Szilágyi stated that he had a mandate that 3,000 Jews must be selected based on several criteria (relatives of prominent Jewish figures, among others). Szilágyi actively participated in compiling the Kastner train passenger list. In the Szolnok camp, council leaders Béla Schwartz of Kisújszállás, Sándor Szűcs of Füzesgyarmat and József Práger of Kiskunhalas selected those to be deported and the families of prominent people, military veterans, and labor servicemen enjoyed an advantage. Upon the request of the central council of Budapest, the council of Pécs compiled a list of 300 prominent people "after terrible mental struggles", as one member, Lajos Gottesmann formulated. Following the war, as part of the Kastner trial in Jerusalem, the Zionist-dominated Jewish council of Kolozsvár (including Ernő, the brother of Rudolf Kastner, and Mózes Weinberger) were accused of keeping the news about Auschwitz silent, and only Zionists were transported to Budapest as part of the Kastner operation.

""We [Jews of Pécs] are patriot, honest people [...], we strictly adhere to all regulations, there will be no problem with us, we do not even move out of the ghetto, and you won't even notice we're here, everyone [among us] takes full moral and financial responsibility [for this], just [...] do everything possible to prevent deportation."
Memorandum of the Jewish Council of Pécs to the local city and church authorities (June 1944)

In several cases, it is known that the Jewish councils wrote memoranda and begging letters to the Hungarian authorities to try to prevent the deportations. For instance, Zionist activist Mór Feldmann, head of the council in Miskolc sent a letter to the local anti-Semitic mayor László Szlávy on 1 May 1944, in which he pleaded for the rescue of 10,000 Jews in an extremely respectful, flattering tone. In Szeged, council head Róbert Pap tried to intercede with Prince-primate Jusztinián Serédi, the Archbishop of Esztergom, who was visiting the city, to save the Jews. He also sent a letter to Lord Lieutenant Aladár Magyary-Kossa, in which he detailed the special past of local Jewish community, among whom "there are no infiltrated foreign Jews" and recalled the counter-revolutionary activity of the local Jewry during the Hungarian Soviet Republic.

Some Jewish council members and their families were exempted from deportation due to their position. Samu Kahan-Frankl claimed in 1964 during the Krumey Trial, an agreement was concluded with the Germans to save rural Jewish councils, who would have been transported by the last trains according to one of László Endre's instructions. During the Kastner trial, Fülöp Freudiger stated that Eichmann, in exchange for substantial sums of money, promised that the first-degree relatives of all Jewish council members throughout Hungary would be exempt from deportation. Freudiger, however, said that the Germans did not keep their promise. Though a few cases are known; the family of the formerly deported Imre Wesel was sent to Budapest. Twenty members of the 24-member Jewish council in Pécs were deported and killed in Auschwitz. Entire councils were wiped out throughout the country, in Délvidék and Carpathian Ruthenia. Several surviving council leaders and members lost all their kinship. Among the 12 leaders of the Neolog district congregations, only four survived the Holocaust. The members of the Jewish council of Budapest, including Béla Berend and Károly Wilhelm, lost many family members during the deportations. Local police and gendarmerie units interrogated and tortured several councilors for alleged "hidden treasures" before their deportation. In Nagyvárad, the gendarmes commanded by lieutenant-colonel Jenő Péterffy, were especially sadistic in their searches for valuables, which took place right by the ghetto in the Dreher brewery. As a result of the torture, council member René Osváth and his wife committed suicide. The Jewish religious elite and the wealthy were also severely abused. Mózes Vorhand, the 81-year-old Orthodox rabbi of Makó was beaten to death. The local enforcement authorities selected their victims from the list of the richest taxpayers from the previous years.

=== List of known councils ===
List of known Jewish councils
Settlement	President	Community	Profession	Organized by
Ács	Ármin Kemény	Orthodox	local religious leader landowner	Miklós Szegő (Székesfehérvár regional council)
Ada (today in Serbia)				
Aknaszlatina (today Solotvyno, Ukraine)				
Alap	Simon Weisz	Orthodox	local religious leader merchant	Miklós Szegő
Albertirsa	István Székely	Status quo	registrar rabbi	
Alsólendva (today Lendava, Slovenia)	Miklós Löwy	Neolog	religion teacher	Nazi authorities
Baja				Mayor Sándor Bernhart
Balassagyarmat	Mihály Lázár	Orthodox	local religious leader broom maker	
Balatonboglár	József Roth		merchant	
Balkány				
Békéscsaba	Ernő Prónai	Neolog	local religious leader lawyer	
Beregszász (today Berehove, Ukraine)	Dávid Weisz			Nazi authorities
Bicske	Ernő Fränkel	Neolog	registrar rabbi	Miklós Szegő
Cece	Sándor Strasser	Orthodox	local religious leader landowner	Miklós Szegő
Cegléd	Farkas Engel	Neolog	registrar rabbi	
Csepreg				
Csoma				
Csongrád	István Faragó	Neolog	local religious leader merchant	mayor and local police
Debrecen	Pál Weisz	Status quo	rabbi	Nazi authorities
Derecske				
Dés (today Dej, Romania)	Lázár Albert	Orthodox	local religious leader merchant	
Dévaványa				
Diósgyőr				
Dragomérfalva (today Dragomirești, Romania)				
Dunapentele	Ernő Bruck	Neolog	local religious leader entrepreneur	Miklós Szegő
Dunaszerdahely (today Dunajská Streda, Slovakia)	József Weisz (Wetzler)	Orthodox	local religious leader merchant	Nazi authorities
Edelény	Henrik Reich		merchant	chief magistrate
Eger	Ernő Polátsik	Status quo	local religious leader director	
Érd	Béla Keszler		grain merchant	
Érsekújvár (today Nové Zámky, Slovakia)	1, János Bernfeld; 2, Leó Horváth	2, Orthodox	2, local religious deputy leader merchant	
Esztergom	Emil Lenkei	Neolog	local religious leader private officer	János Biringer (Győr regional council)
Felcsút	Lajos Mühlrad	Neolog	local religious leader landowner	Miklós Szegő
Felsővisó (today Vișeu de Sus, Romania)				
Füzesgyarmat	Sándor Szűcs	Neolog	local religious leader merchant	
Galánta (today Galanta, Slovakia)				
Gyoma	Gáspár Tardos	Neolog	local religious leader lawyer	
Gyöngyös	Ármin Vajda	Status quo	local religious leader lawyer	
Győr	Gyula Unger	Neolog	local religious leader chief physician	
Győrszentmárton	Pál Lehner	Orthodox	local religious leader	Miklós Szegő
Gyula	Frigyes Keppich	Neolog	local religious leader lawyer	
Hajdúdorog	László Hecz			
Hajdúnánás	László Nyakas			
Hatvan	Jenő Sebők			
Heves				
Hódmezővásárhely	Béla Deutsch	Neolog	local religious leader chief physician	
Huszt (today Khust, Ukraine)	Sámuel Lázárovits	Orthodox	local religious leader timber merchant	Nazi authorities
Ilosva (today Irshava, Ukraine)				
Ipolyság (today Šahy, Slovakia)	József Holló	Status quo	local religious leader lawyer	Nazi authorities
Iza (today in Ukraine)				Huszt council
Jánosháza				
Jászárokszállás	Gyula Katona	Neolog	local religious leader physician	
Jászberény	Béla Reich	Orthodox	registrar rabbi	
Jászladány	Mihály Garami		merchant	
Kalocsa	Mátyás Wolf		lawyer	
Kápolnásnyék	Miksa Deutsch	Neolog	local religious leader timber merchant	Miklós Szegő
Kaposvár	1, Jenő Mittelman; 2, Ödön Antl	1, Neolog; 2, Orthodox	1, local religious leader pharmacist 2, timber merchant	
Kapuvár	1, Miksa Goldschmied; 2, Pál Zeichmeister	2, Orthodox	2, Chevra kadisha president	Nazi authorities
Karcag	Sándor Kertész	Orthodox	local religious leader lawyer	
Kassa (today Košice, Slovakia)	Ákos Kolos	Neolog	local religious leader lawyer	
Kecel	György Vető	Orthodox	local religious notary merchant	
Kecskemét	Dezső Schönberger	Neolog	local religious deputy leader wool merchant	Mayor Béla Liszka
Keszthely	Endre Kovács		lawyer	chief magistrate
Kiskőrös				
Kiskunfélegyháza	J. Endre Steiner			
Kiskunhalas	József Práger	Orthodox	local religious leader lawyer	Mayor Mihály Kathona
Kispest				
Kisújszállás	1, Béla Schwartz; 2, Sándor Strasser	2, Neolog	1, landowner 2, merchant	
Kisvárda				
Kolozsvár (today Cluj-Napoca, Romania)	József Fischer	Neolog	local religious leader lawyer	
Kolta (today in Slovakia)	Izidor Büchinger	Orthodox	local religious leader landowner	János Biringer (Győr regional council)
Komárom	Sámuel Weisz	Neolog	local religious leader physician	
Kökényes (today Ternovo, Ukraine)				
Körmend				
Kunhegyes	Ármin Spiegel	Neolog	community member merchant	
Léva (today Levice, Slovakia)	István Fischer	Neolog	local religious leader lawyer	
Losonc (today Lučenec, Slovakia)				mayor
Magyarbánhegyes	Lajos Borostyán		pharmacist	
Makó				
Máramarossziget (today Sighetu Marmației, Romania)	Lipót Joszovits	Orthodox	local religious leader estate owner	Nazi authorities
Mátészalka	Frigyes Grünbaum	Orthodox	registrar rabbi	
Mezőberény	Dezső Grünwald		lawyer	
Mezőcsát	Jenő Kolozs	Orthodox	local religious leader mill owner	
Mezőkeresztes	Lajos Szántó	Orthodox	local religious leader merchant	
Mezőkövesd				gendarmerie
Mezőtúr	1, Sándor Vas; 2, Fülöp Schulz; 3, Sándor Salzmann	2, Neolog	1, mill owner 2, rabbi 3, grain merchant	
Miskolc	Mór Feldmann	Orthodox	local religious leader engineer	
Mohács	Ernő Fischer	Neolog	local religious leader lawyer	
Monor	Izidor Hermann	Neolog	local religious leader merchant	
Mosonmagyaróvár	Oszkár Frischmann			
Munkács (today Mukachevo, Ukraine)	Sándor Steiner/Steuer			
Nagybánya (today Baia Mare, Romania)	N Lustig			
Nagykanizsa	Jenő Halphen	Neolog	local religious leader lawyer	
Nagykapos (today Veľké Kapušany, Slovakia)				
Nagykároly (today Carei, Romania)				
Nagykáta	Soma Breuer	Neolog	registrar rabbi	
Nagymegyer (today Veľký Meder, Slovakia)				
Nagysurány (today Šurany, Slovakia)				
Nagyszőlős (today Vynohradiv, Ukraine)	Emil Würzberger	Orthodox	local religious leader mill owner	
Nagyvárad (today Oradea, Romania)	Sándor Leitner	Orthodox	local religious leader merchant	
Nyíregyháza	Gábor Fischbein	Status quo	local religious leader bank director	Mayor Pál Szohor
Orosháza				
Ózd	József Fodor			
Pacsa	1, Lajos Kasztl; 2, József Rechnitzer		1, innkeeper 2, merchant	chief magistrate
Pápa	Albert Krausz			
Párkány (today Štúrovo, Slovakia)				
Pécs	József Greiner	Neolog	local religious leader lawyer	
Pelsőc (today Plešivec, Slovakia)				
Pestszenterzsébet				
Pestszentimre				
Pestszentlőrinc				
Pilipec (today Pylypets, Ukraine)				
Püspökladány				Nazi authorities
Rajka				
Rákoscsaba	László Vas			
Rákospalota	Ignác N			
Rozsnyó (today Rožňava, Slovakia)				
Salgótarján	Samu Friedler	Orthodox	local religious leader merchant	
Sárbogárd	Miklós Zsombor			Miklós Szegő
Sárkeresztúr	Adolf Lusztig	Neolog	local religious leader	Miklós Szegő
Sárvár	Ernő Fischer	Orthodox	local religious leader miller	
Sátoraljaújhely	Lajos Rosenberg	Status quo	local religious leader lawyer	
Seregélyes				Miklós Szegő
Siófok	Andor Burg		glassmaker	
Sopron	Zsigmond Rosenheim		merchant	Nazi authorities
Szabadka (today Subotica, Serbia)				
Szatmárnémeti (today Satu Mare, Romania)	Zoltán Schwartz			
Szécsény	Dániel László	Orthodox	local religious leader physician	
Szeged	Róbert Pap	Neolog	local religious leader lawyer	
Székesfehérvár	Miklós Szegő	Neolog	local religious leader jurist	
Szeklence (today Sokyrnytsia, Ukraine)				
Szekszárd	Nándor Erdős	Neolog	local religious leader baker	
Szendrő	Jenő Groszmann	Orthodox	local religious leader timber merchant	chief magistrate
Szentes	Sándor Gunst	Neolog	local religious leader ironmonger	
Szolnok	Sándor Mandel	Neolog	local religious leader lawyer	
Szolyva (today Svaliava, Ukraine)	N Kahn			
Szombathely	1, Manó Vályi; 2, Imre Wesel; 3, Ferenc Zalán	1, Neolog; 2, Neolog; 3, Neolog	1, community superior, merchant 2, district religious leader 3, local religious leader	János Biringer (Győr regional council); Nazi authorities
Szúcs	Kálmán Klosszer			
Tab				notary public
Tapolca	Salamon Halpert	Neolog	registrar rabbi	
Técső (today Tiachiv, Ukraine)	Jenő Róth			
Tiszafüred	Ernő Weiner		timber merchant	
Tornalja (today Tornaľa, Slovakia)	Sámuel Krakovits	Orthodox	local religious leader timber merchant	
Törökszentmiklós	Sándor Katona		merchant	
Újpest	Dénes Friedman	Neolog	registrar rabbi	
Újvidék (today, Novi Sad, Serbia)	Nándor Lusztig	Neolog	local religious leader lawyer	
Ungvár (today, Uzhhorod, Ukraine)	Gyula László	Orthodox	local religious leader pharmacist	
Vác	Fülöp Pollák	Neolog	registrar rabbi	mayor
Vágsellye (today Šaľa, Slovakia)				
Vágvecse (today Veča in Šaľa, Slovakia)	Nándor Ruhig	Orthodox	local religious leader timber merchant	Miklós Szegő
Várpalota				
Vasvár				
Verebély (today Vráble, Slovakia)	Adolf Gürtler	Orthodox	local religious leader merchant	
Veszprém	Lajos Kun	Neolog	registrar rabbi	Nazi authorities
Zalaegerszeg	1, Imre Berger; 2, Miksa Fekete	1, Neolog; 2, Convert	1, local religious leader lawyer 2, merchant	Mayor István Tamásy
Zombor (today Sombor, Serbia)	Miklós Vas			

== Representation of the Converts ==
=== Within Jewish councils ===
Under the Second and Third Jewish Laws, approximately 100,000 Christians were considered Jews. Following the German occupation of Hungary, in many cases, their representation was placed under the jurisdiction of the newly established Jewish councils. This gave rise to mutual distrust between Jews and those of Jewish origin within these administrative bodies. Several witnesses complained during the post-war trials that the Converts "received advantages at the expense of others". As a unique case, Miksa Fekete, a converted Jew, became president of the Jewish council of Zalaegerszeg on 23 May 1944. Converts also played an important role in other councils. In Eger, physician Alfréd Sarló was responsible for the ghetto's healthcare. József Óváry, a Reformed Presbyterian and Convert member of the council in Balatonboglár, was still a member of the far-right Hungarian National Defence Association (MOVE) in the early 1920s.

"We had to move in with the Jews, who hated us. All day long, our children listen to their mockery, the blasphemy of our Savior and Our Lady."
Gábor Schön's letter to Cardinal Jusztinián Serédi

For many Converts, the experience of identifying with Jewry meant a shock-like crisis and a feeling of exclusion. Many letters of complaint to the Hungarian prelates bear witness to the hatred of the Jews towards them. An anonymous complainant lamented that they were required to wear a yellow badge, while a Jewish WWI veteran was not, by law. The Converts felt they were discriminated against by the Jewish councils; their apartments were the first to be taken during expropriations, they got the hardest physical jobs and the highest taxes were levied on them. Regarding the latter, Ernő Prónai, president of the council of Békéscsaba noted that the richest Jews had converted to Christianity recently. Ernő Munkácsi recalled that Eichmann told him the "Converts are the richest [Jews]", therefore, to fulfill the demands of the Germans, he proposed taxing them.

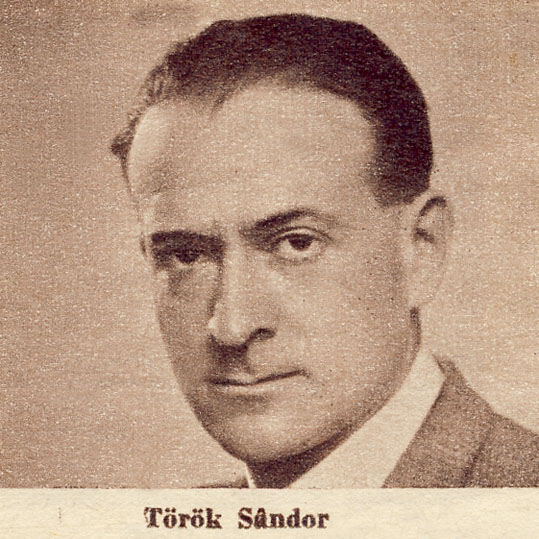
Sándor Török, writer and representative of the converted Jews during the Holocaust

The Holy Cross Association, a Catholic advocate organization of the Converts, requested the Hungarian government to establish a separate council for the converted Jews on 29 March 1944. Leaders of the Christian churches, including Archbishop Serédi, made similar requests. In May 1944, The archbishop petitioned to the Sztójay cabinet that the Converts be placed in a separate ghetto, be allowed to go to church and not be deported. Prime Minister Döme Sztójay rejected the proposal in a short marginal note.

By the end of April 1944, journalist and writer Sándor Török, a well-known author of children's books, was delegated to the Jewish Council of Budapest, to represent the Converts, upon the intercession of his former colleague, far-right journalist and later government minister Ferenc Rajniss. The Holy Cross Association opposed the appointment of Török because he was a Reformed protestant and had not been an active member of his church before that. The Evangelical Church also demanded its own place in the council, representing those members of its community who were declared Jewish. Even the Reformed Church was not satisfied: Calvinist pastor József Éliás claimed the Jewish Council of Budapest functioned as a denomination, therefore a Reformed person could not be a member. In his report at the end of May, Török spoke out against the passivity of Christian churches in the case of converted forced laborers, those who receive food only from Jews, the rabbis also deal with them, while the Christian priests and pastors avoid the labor camps.

=== Christian Jewish Council ===
In early July 1944, the Ministry of the Interior drafted a plan to set up a separate council of Converts. Sándor Török, among others, participated in the drafting of the statute, which never entered into force. The organization would have consisted of nine members (five Catholics, two Reformed, one Evangelical, one representative of smaller Christian denominations) under the supervision of the three largest Christian churches. The motto would have been "Venite ad me omnes", meaning "Come to Me All" (Matthew 11:28). Around the same time, representatives of the Hungarian government – István Antal and Miklós Mester – and the Reformed and Evangelical churches – like Bishop László Ravasz – negotiated on the establishment of a ministerial subdivision dealing with Converts in the Ministry of Religion and Education.

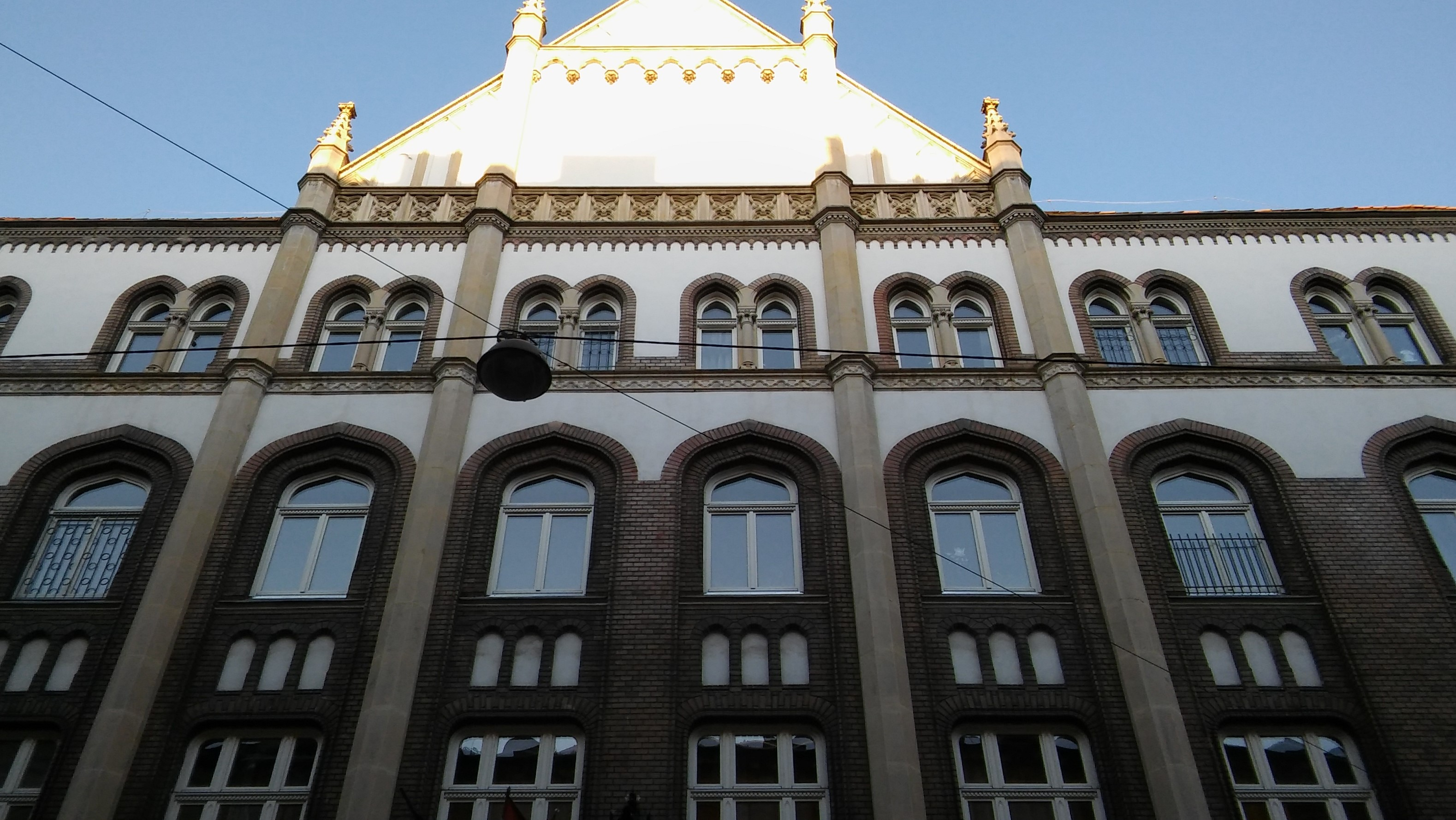
Building of the Scottish Mission in Budapest (now a primary school), where the Christian Jewish Council was given a room as their headquarters

The decree of 2540/1944 M. E. prescribed the organization of the representation of Converts in a separate administrative body, establishing the Association of Christian Jews of Hungary (Hungarian: Magyarországi Keresztény Zsidók Szövetsége), better known informally as the "Christian Jewish Council" on 22 July 1944. With this step, the Sztójay government was able to demonstrate in front of foreign missions that the Converts were treated positively. Török wrote in his memoir that "if the yellow badge remains, then this new Association is really an eye-wash, nothing more than a decorative cover [for the government]". Nevertheless, Török became vice-president of the new council, which was officially presided over by attorney György Auer, but Török remained the de facto leader and most active member of the council, whose headquarters was the Scottish Mission (St. Columba's Church of Scotland) building at Vörösmarty utca 49–51.

The Christian Jewish Council had nine members and sixteen employees. Török constantly tried to get money for their operation from the Christian churches, but he also demanded rights similar to those of the capital's Jewish council (for instance, police protection). However, the council was mostly inaccessible to the Converts, who still preferred to address their letters to the church leaders. Several thousand people converted from Judaism in Budapest throughout in 1944, Jewish council member Béla Berend accused the Christian Jewish Council, among others, for this phenomenon. Berend even gave an anonymous, and later controversial interview to a far-right newspaper Harc! (the official journal of Zoltán Bosnyák's institute) on the subject, in which he emphasized that it is not possible to leave Judaism, "one can only be born a non-Jew, but with baptism, never". Berend claimed the purpose of these conversions is only to protect assets, and that "Christian churches [have] become asset-saving asylums, because of the many frightened Israelites, who are running away from standing, struggling with inhibitions, refusing their blood". The Magyarországi Zsidók Lapja also stated that the persecution of Jews was based on race, so conversion is unnecessary.

The Christian Jewish Council constantly appealed for Converts to be able to move out of the yellow-star houses and for the ability to designate their own houses in Budapest. Tibor Keledy, the Lord Mayor of Budapest ordered a census of the converted Jews to move them separately from the Jewish yellow-star houses on 11 July 1944, but because of the objections of the Jewish council this plan failed. On 31 July–1 August, György Auer and Sándor Török negotiated with council members Ernő Pető and Károly Wilhelm in the Ministry of the Interior on the subject, but without result. Török sought closer cooperation between the two organizations (joint visits to the internment camps, joint presence in reconciliation bodies, etc.), but there was no openness to that from part of Jewish leadership, who strongly discriminated against converts who they regarded as "betrayers of the faith". In the allocation of aid, measures were frequently taken against the Converts. Török was successful in sabotaging the list of converted Jews released to the German authorities. The Christian Jewish Council was disestablished in the first days of the Arrow Cross Party coup, Sándor Török survived the siege of the capital at the mansion of former government minister Emil Nagy.

== Reputation ==
=== Confrontations within the community ===
The accusations began immediately after the World War II in connection with the evaluation of the activities of the Jewish Council of Budapest. The MIOI held its first assembly in August 1945, with the participation of the remaining religious communities from countryside, where sharp confrontations took place. Lajos Stöckler, who served as president of the PIH from 1945 to 1950, emphasized the atrocities against Jews in Budapest (shot into the Danube, etc.). He characterized the function of the central Jewish council as a "messenger" between the state and religious communities. Survivors from the rural communities demanded, however, an indictment, accusing the council of favoritism and collaboration. Béla Dénes, a Zionist physician, considered that the council deliberately left the Jews "uninformed" regarding the real purpose of deportations. To prevent accusations, several former members of all Jewish councils wrote memoirs, including Samu Stern (titled Versenyfutás az idővel!, lit. "A Race with Time").

"If it is to forget, then how? If it is to remember, then what is the psychic practice for this to be fruitful? [...] Then every touch of every wound bled; that didn't even wait to be touched, it bled."
Sándor Török: Egy kis kertet szerettem volna (1979)

Simultaneously, the Christian Jewish Council was accused by former members of the Jewish Council of Budapest of "inaction" and "passivity". According to Ernő Munkácsi, the only result of its activity was "lots of conversions".

Stöckler tried to treat the accusations of collaboration as "Jewish internal affairs", which must be arranged and clarified within the MIOI. The Hungarian Zionist Association settled a "trial" against the Jewish council which was accused of collaboration and support of Horthy's anti-democratic system. Due to the martyrdom of Ottó Komoly, the Zionists placed themselves outside the activities of the Jewish Council and represented themselves as the only effective resistance movement against the crimes of the Holocaust.

The various surviving Jewish religious communities established verification committees, which investigated the activities of the members of the Jewish leadership during the World War II, especially after the German invasion of Hungary. Beginning in May 1945, 460 people were examined via questionnaires in Budapest within 4–5 weeks. The majority of the leaders were verified, including Stöckler, Földes, József Nagy or Rezső Roóz. Though, within the Neolog community, there were accusations and indictments, against Miksa Domonkos (for his leadership role in the Budapest Ghetto) and Albert Geyer (from the housing department) and others, but these accusations were found to be unfounded. Three proceedings were opened against Ernő Munkácsi, who was also held accountable for pre-war abuses (e.g. low wages within religious communities). The verification committee classified Munkácsi as unfit to hold a leadership position because he went into hiding following the Arrow Cross Party's takeover in October 1944, abandoning his community (however he tried unsuccessfully to return to work to the Jewish council in December). The People's Tribunal, as an appeal forum, overturned the verdict and acquitted Munkácsi in October 1945. Munkácsi was accused of collaboration and withholding of the news of Auschwitz in 1947. According to Munkácsi, regarding the latter, János Gábor, who had already died by then, expressed doubts. Munkácsi was again acquitted by an investigate body in 1948 but he requested his retirement.

=== Post-war trials ===
The surviving members of the Jewish councils instantly became subjects of the show trials prepared by the Communist-dominated Peoples' Courts. In May 1945, an investigation was launched against Samu Stern too. In November 1945, investigators searched the apartments of Stern and Károly Wilhelm, where they allegedly seized foreign currencies and Wilhelm was arrested. Szabad Nép, the official newspaper of the Hungarian Communist Party (MKP) connected the amounts to the collaborative behavior of the defunct Jewish Council of Budapest, who had "only helped rich Jews". Journalist and party member Oszkár Betlen determined that there are two types of Jews: "worthy" workers and "spineless" ones. For the latter, "any kind of suffering can't be excused, we have to liquidate them and we will do it." The satirical Ludas Matyi mocked the activity of Stern and the Jewish council during the Holocaust with caricatures. Samu Stern died on 8 June 1946, at the age of 72, which thus made the unfolding of the show trial impossible. The investigation was officially closed in August 1948.

"He who could have done something else, more and better in those times, in that hard position, should cast the first stone at us."
Samu Stern: Emlékirataim. Versenyfutás az idővel

Around the same time, survivors of rural councils and the lower leaders of the central council were also investigated. Shortly after the end of the war and the Soviet occupation of Hungary, in June 1945, a file was opened in the case of Ödön Antl, a former president of the council in Kaposvár, who had economic connections in Germany as a timber merchant and, according to the indictment, took an active role in Hungary's entry into the World War II. The charges were quickly dropped and Antl fled Hungary around 1950. The investigation against Rezső Müller was also dropped without an indictment in the summer of 1948. Lajos Gondos, head of the Jewish ghetto police in Simapuszta internment camp (Nyíregyháza) was sentenced to two-year imprisonment in the first instance in August 1946, but later he was acquitted by the National Council of People's Tribunals (NOT) in the same year. Because of their selection works among the deportees in the Szolnok sugar factory, council leaders Béla Schwartz of Kisújszállás and Sándor Szűcs of Füzesgyarmat were accused of war crimes. In the second instance, both of them were acquitted.

In the 1940s, the largest trial was the judicial proceedings against Béla Berend. Immediately after the war's end in Hungary, Berend was arrested in Sátoraljaújhely and was transferred to Budapest in April 1945. He was taken into custody on 18 May 1945. According to the accusations, he was an informant of the Gestapo during the Holocaust. Under violent interrogations and tortures in the headquarters of the Budapest Department of State Political Police (PRO) in May–June 1945, Berend testified that he gave the property of the deported Jews of Szigetvár to the gendarmes, reported the activities of the other members of the Jewish Council of Budapest to the Nazi authorities, raped numerous women during the German occupation and kept Jewish property seized himself. PRO used the letters of Berend to László Endre, in which he argued for the emigration of the Jews, as evidence. However, the war criminal Endre testified in his own trial that he never answered these letters, and Berend was never his spy nor a participant of the deportations in Szigetvár. Simultaneously with the interrogations, the pro-Communist newspapers (e.g. Magyar Nemzet, Reggel, Szabad Szó, Ludas Matyi) launched a series of disparaging campaigns against Berend, calling him a "Nazi-puppet rabbi" and the "informant of the Gestapo". The press mentioned his friendship with the notorious anti-Semite Zoltán Bosnyák. Allegedly, Berend watched the deportations in Szigetvár while reading a far-right newspaper (Magyarság) and laughing, which became a widely spread theme of him. In one of its caricatures, Ludas Matyi depicted Berend wearing SS uniform and prayer scarf.

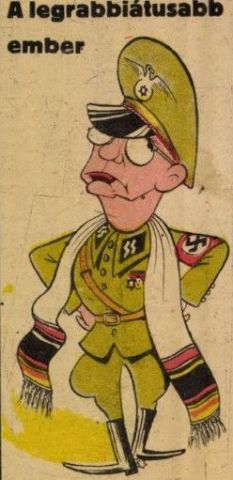
Ludas Matyi's caricature depicts Béla Berend wearing an SS uniform (August 1946).

Prosecutor Mihály Rhosóczy of the People's Prosecutor's Office of Budapest submitted his indictment against Berend to the People's Tribunal of Budapest on 4 July 1946. Berend was accused of war crimes and acts against the people. According to the indictment, Berend was an informant of the gendarmes, the Arrow Cross Party and the Gestapo regarding the whereabouts of Jewish wealth and he also took part in a raid to the International Ghetto (Pozsonyi út) in January 1945. He collaborated with Bosnyák to transfer Jewish ritual artifacts and books to the Jewish Question Institute. He was also accused of expropriating jewelry taken from the dead in the Budapest Ghetto and abusing his authority. Berend's aforementioned interview to the far-right journal Harc! was a significant point of the accusation. Berend's trial began on 2 August 1946, which was heard for another four days in October–November 1946. His defense lawyer was Károly Dietz. Berend denied all charges and spoke of torture occurred in the building of PRO. He argued that he supported Zionism and thus the migration of Jews to Palestine because this would have saved the lives of a significant part of the Jewry, and in this matter he tried to influence the anti-Semitic politicians. He denied that he had provided benefits to women in Szigetvár or the ghetto for sexual services. Regarding his interview, all of his former colleagues (Munkácsi, Hahn) defended the content of the article. The trial highlighted the personal conflict between Stern and Berend in the previous years. Former leading members of the Jewish council appeared as witnesses, and all of them spoke positively of Berend's activities during the Holocaust. According to István Földes, Berend in many cases personally handled internees' cases. Munkácsi testified that Berend helped "many people" by obtaining false documents. Domonkos praised him that, in the last weeks of the ghetto, Berend took care of the pastoral duties almost single-handedly. Nevertheless, Berend had influential connections with the authorities. For instance, József Nagy was granted access to the Ministry of the Interior for his intercession. Other testimonies emphasized that he procured medicines, hid runaway forced labour workers and maintained a counterfeiting operation in his office. On 23 November 1946, the People's Tribunal found Berend guilty on two counts of the indictment and sentenced him to ten-year imprisonment. Senior judge István Gálfalvy formulated a dissenting opinion, in which he wrote that Berend could only be condemned for the interview. In April 1947, the NOT acquitted Berend of all charges. Contemporary press (Szabad Nép) was not satisfied with the verdict and continued to see him as a Nazi collaborator. Berend, who emigrated to the United States, devoted the rest of his life to nullifying the negative image that had formed of him, but his submissions, writings, and legal actions did not reach their goal.

Preparations for a show trial started 1953 in Budapest to "prove" that Raoul Wallenberg had never been in the Soviet Union, that nobody had dragged off Wallenberg in 1945, least of all the Soviet Army bu instead that he had been the victim of cosmopolitan Zionists. Three leaders of the Budapest Jewish community, László Benedek, Lajos Stöckler, and Miksa Domonkos, as well as two additional "eyewitnesses" Pál Szalai and Károly Szabó were arrested and tortured by the State Protection Authority (ÁVH). The preparations for the show trial were initiated in Moscow, as part of Joseph Stalin's increasing antisemitic and anti-Zionist campaign – e.g. Solomon Mikhoels murder, Night of the Murdered Poets (of the World War II era Jewish Anti-Fascist Committee), Slansky Trial, Doctors' Plot. After Stalin's death on 5 March 1953, and as Lavrentiy Beria was executed, the trial was aborted and the prisoners were released in fall 1953. Due to severe torture, Miksa Domonkos died in February 1954, shortly after being released and Lajos Stöckler was psychologically impaired. Stöckler emigrated to Australia during the Hungarian Revolution of 1956 and died there in 1960.

=== Historiography ===
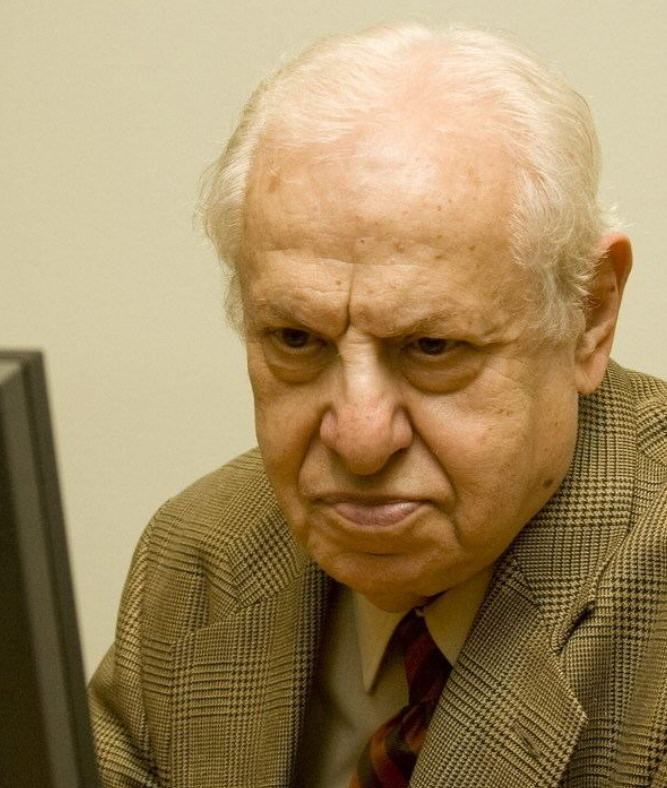
Randolph L. Braham

Jenő Lévai wrote the first academic work (Zsidósors Európában. Az üldözések kora; lit. "Jewish Fate in Europe. The Age of Persecutions") about the history of the Holocaust in Hungary in 1948, three years after the tragic events. In his work, Lévai described the Jewish Council as an "enthusiastically collaborating, expert organization, which later obeyed [the Nazis'] orders and fulfilled all their wishes humbly with exaggerated goodwill". A three-volume source collection (Vádirat a nácizmus ellen; lit. "An Indictment against Nazism"; 1958, 1960 and 1967) was published by the National Representation of Hungarian Israelites (MIOK, successor of the MIOI). Among the editors was historian Elek Karsai, a vocal critic of the Jewish councils. The monograph included a disproportionately large proportion of documents from Jewish councils (approx. one quarter to one fifth), in comparison to their influence. In her prelude, editor Ilona Benoschofsky, who was a former employee of the council's housing department, wrote that the Jewish leadership "carried out German orders without resistance and did not try to find the very small possibilities of escape". Their resignation or suicide would have had "a moral value", she added. Karsai considered that the anti-deportation pamphlets reflected the "cowardly behavior" of the Jewish Council. In an article, Karsai claimed that the "Judenrats [in Hungary] helped the Germans in the realization of their genocidal intentions as obedient, well-functioning apparatuses". Hannah Arendt even accused the members of the central council of actually enjoying their power.

"There is this Jew woken at night by a loud banging on the door. "Who's there?" he asks, terrified. "The Gestapo," goes the answer. "Thank God," he sighs with relief. "For a moment I thought it was the Jewish Council"."
A post-war joke in Budapest

Braham, the most influential researcher of the Holocaust in Hungary, considered that Jewish councils in Europe became "involuntary accessories to German crimes", whose members, who intended to buy time to alleviate the suffering of the Jews, "were trapped into outright though unwitting collaboration". He argued that, following Hungary's occupation, the few Germans "had to consider the rapid advance of the Soviet forces in the East", in proceeding with their plan to exterminate the Jews, thus it became necessary to maintain the optimism and false sense of security of the local Jewish community (to avoid such events like Warsaw Ghetto Uprising), which was possible through Jewish councils.

Gábor Kádár and Zoltán Vági argued that the activity of the Central Jewish Council can be described as "a compulsion of bad choices". There is argument that most members undertook the role because of their hope of personal survival. Isaiah Trunk reported that only 86 out 720 members of all Eastern European Jewish councils survived the Holocaust (12%), while the survival rate within the Jewish Council of Budapest (14 out of 17 members, 82%) was much higher. Kádár and Vági considered that this figure was due to the relatively large-scale survival of Budapest's Jews instead of their council membership. According to them, the Jewish council chose their strategy, the policy of legality and loyalty, and despite their goodwill, they became "the obedient instruments of the Nazi extermination policy". László Bernát Veszprémy described the Jewish leadership during the Holocaust "a victim stratum attacked by everyone, but investigated by only a few".

== Sources ==
- Braham, Randolph L. (1981). The Politics of Genocide: The Holocaust in Hungary. Vol. 1–2. New York: Columbia University Press. ISBN 0-231-04496-8.
- Kádár, Gábor; Vági, Zoltán (2008). "Compulsion of Bad Choices. Questions, Dilemmas, Decisions: The Activity of the Hungarian Central Jewish Council in 1944". In Kovács, András (ed.). Jewish Studies at the Central European University, 2005–2007. CEU Press. pp. 71–89. ISBN 978-9637326721.
- Karsai, Elek (1967). Vádirat a nácizmus ellen. Dokumentumok a magyarországi zsidóüldözés történetéhez [An Indictment against Nazism. Documents for the History of the Persecution of Jews in Hungary] (in Hungarian). Vol. 3. Budapest: National Representation of Hungarian Israelites (MIOK).
- Molnár, Judit (2002). "The Foundation and Activities of the Hungarian Jewish Council, March 20 – July 7, 1944". Yad Vashem Studies. 30: 93–123. ISSN 0084-3296.
- Munkácsi, Ernő (1947). Hogyan történt? Adatok és okmányok a magyar zsidóság tragédiájához [How It Happened: Documenting the Tragedy of Hungarian Jewry] (in Hungarian). Budapest: Renaissance.
- Schmidt, Mária (1990). Kollaboráció vagy kooperáció? A Budapesti Zsidó Tanács [Collaboration or Cooperation? The Jewish Council of Budapest] (in Hungarian). Budapest: Minerva. ISBN 963-223-438-3.
- Veszprémy, László Bernát (2021). "Kik vezették a vidéki zsidó tanácsokat? [Who led the rural Jewish councils?]". Múlt és Jövő (Új folyam) (in Hungarian). 32 (1): 101–117. ISSN 0864-8646.
- Veszprémy, László Bernát (2023). Tanácstalanság. A zsidó vezetés Magyarországon és a holokauszt, 1944–1945 [Bereft of Council. Jewish leadership in Hungary during the Holocaust in 1944–1945] (in Hungarian). Budapest: Jaffa Kiadó. ISBN 978-963-475-731-3.
