= György Vető =

Hungarian Jewish merchant and religious leader (1898–1977)

- Born: Avraham Weisz; 25 May 1898; Kecel, Austria-Hungary
- Died: 9 June 1977 (aged 79); Kiskunhalas, Hungary
- Known for: head of the Judenrat in Kecel

György Vető (born Avraham Weisz; 25 May 1898 – 9 June 1977) was a Hungarian Jewish merchant and religious leader. He presided the Judenrat in Kecel during the Holocaust.

== Career ==
György Vető was born as Avraham Weisz into an Orthodox Jewish family in Kecel, Pest-Pilis-Solt-Kiskun County on 25 May 1898, as the son of Jiszrael Weisz (later Szilárd Vető) and Fanny Hesser. His family magyarized their surname to Vető in 1902. He graduated from trade school in Budapest, then worked as an iron and general merchant in the family store in Kecel. Vető fought in the World War I. According to his epitaph, he was awarded orders of valor. He functioned as notary of the local Orthodox Jewish congregation.

In accordance with the anti-Semitic laws, Vető was interned in the summer of 1941, confiscating his wealth while his family was expelled from Kecel. They were permitted to return to there in the spring of 1942, under strict police supervision. Following the German invasion of Hungary in March 1944, the chief settlement clerk instructed Vető to compile a list of local Jews and establish a two-member Jewish council according to the newly adopted regulations. His role was only formal, within weeks the Jews were locked up in a ghetto and then deported by the local gendarmerie units. Vető and his colleague were permitted to go out of the ghetto to get food and medicine, under armed escort. Vető was transferred to the internment camp in Szeged then deported to Austria. He and his son survived the Holocaust, but his 74-year mother was murdered on her death march from Mauthausen to Gunskirchen in April 1945.

Vető returned to Kecel following the war. He unsuccessfully tried to recover his stolen property. His store was nationalized in 1949 by the Communist authorities. Vető supported Zionism and was an advocate for the Jewish National Fund. He wrote the history of the Jews of Kecel in 1965. He died in Kiskunhalas on 9 June 1977.

== Sources ==
- Veszprémy, László Bernát (2021). "Kik vezették a vidéki zsidó tanácsokat? [Who led the rural Jewish councils?]". Múlt és Jövő (Új folyam) (in Hungarian). 32 (1): 101–117. ISSN 0864-8646.
