= Béla Schwartz =

Jewish council member in Hungary

- Born: 21 March 1891; Dormánd, Austria-Hungary
- Known for: head of the Judenrat in Kisújszállás

Béla Schwartz (21 March 1891 – ?) was a Hungarian Jewish leader during the World War II. Following the German invasion of Hungary, he served as president of the Judenrat in Kisújszállás.

== Early life ==
Béla Schwartz was born into a Neolog Jewish family in Dormánd, Heves County on 21 March 1891. After finishing four-grade secondary technical school, he fought at the Romanian Front during World War I. He retired as a sergeant-major at the end of the war. Thereafter, he lived and farmed in an estate in the borough Karahát near Kisújszállás together with his wife and four children. He functioned as magistrate of the local Jewish religious community.

== During the Holocaust ==
Following the German occupation of Hungary in March 1944, the local Hungarian authorities instructed Schwartz and Sándor Strasser to establish a Jewish council. According to his later testimony, Schwartz was threatened with internment if he did not carry out the order. He was de facto was the sole president of Judenrat since Strasser remained inactive during the Holocaust.

The Jews of Kisújszállás, as well as all communities in the wider region, were transferred to the Szolnok internment camp, a sugar factory. There Schwartz took part unknowingly in compiling the Kastner train passenger list, when, alongside other Jewish council leaders from the region, he was forced to select among those to be deported, the families of prominent people, military veterans, and labor servicemen enjoyed an advantage. Sándor Mandel, head of the Jewish council in Szolnok, received the instructions for the selection from the Nazis, who forwarded this order to the Jewish council leaders of those communities who were interned to Szolnok. In this capacity, Schwartz and Strasser formed a five-member delegation to execute the process. The exempted Jews were sent to Bergen-Belsen, from where they fled to Switzerland, while the rest were sent to the Auschwitz concentration camp where most of them were murdered. During the process, Schwartz also avoided this fate and was transported to Strasshoff, where the chance of survival was greater (about 75 percent of 21,000 Hungarian Jews deported to Strasshof survived due to an agreement between the Aid and Rescue Committee of Budapest and Adolf Eichmann). Nevertheless, prior to that, Schwartz was tortured in the Szolnok sugar factory, and he also lost five brothers and two daughters in the Holocaust.

== Post-war indictment ==
Schwartz returned to Hungary after World War II. The People's Tribunal, alongside Sándor Szűcs, head of the Judenrat in Füzesgyarmat, accused him of war crimes and collaboration with Nazi Germany in 1946. They were the only rural Jewish council leaders accused of Nazi collaboration after the war. In his defense, Schwartz indicated that he was under constant death threat, and tried to share the burden of responsibility and referred to the fair principle of selection. He stated that he did not know the fate of those who were not selected during the selection, he had not heard of the Auschwitz extermination camp and gas chambers at that time. At first instance, the People's Tribunal found him guilty, sentenced him to two years in prison and a substantial fine (3,000 HUF). At second instance, the National Council of People's Tribunals (NOT) acquitted both Schwartz and Szűcs, because it was not possible to prove their intention to directly place non-excepted persons in the group going to Auschwitz.

The fate of Béla Schwartz is unknown after his acquittal.

== Sources ==
- Veszprémy, László Bernát (2021). "Kik vezették a vidéki zsidó tanácsokat? [Who led the rural Jewish councils?]". Múlt és Jövő (Új folyam) (in Hungarian). 32 (1): 101–117. ISSN 0864-8646.
- Veszprémy, László Bernát (2023). Tanácstalanság. A zsidó vezetés Magyarországon és a holokauszt, 1944–1945 [Bereft of Council. Jewish leadership in Hungary during the Holocaust in 1944–1945] (in Hungarian). Budapest: Jaffa Kiadó. ISBN 978-963-475-731-3.
