= Ernő Prónai =

Jewish council member in Hungary

- Born: 25 March 1885; Budapest, Austria-Hungary
- Died: 29 June 1944 (aged 59); Auschwitz concentration camp
- Cause of death: murdered by Nazi Germany
- Known for: head of the Judenrat in Békéscsaba
- Spouse: Mária Guttmann

Ernő Prónai (25 March 1885 – 29 June 1944) was a Hungarian Jewish jurist during the World War II. Following the German invasion of Hungary, he served as president of the Judenrat in Békéscsaba.

== Career ==
Ernő Prónai was born in Budapest in 1885, as the son of József Prónai and Hermina Körpel. The original family name was Neugeboren. He studied law in Budapest. Moving to Békéscsaba, he became a wealthy lawyer. During his career, he served as chief prosecutor of Békés County, he worked as legal counsel for the Commercial Bank of Békés County and was a board member of the Békéscsabai Áruforgalmi Rt. company. He was also a member of the legislature of Békéscsaba in the 1930s. Prónai became head of the local Neolog Jewish congregation prior to May 1941. At the time of the German invasion, he was also acting president of the 21st congregation district (Nagyvárad) of the Neolog community due to the long-term illness of Samu Meer.

He married Mária Guttmann in November 1918. They had a son and a daughter Anna (b. 1922). Prónai and his wife were one of the wealthiest residents of Békéscsaba, owing a ten-room apartment (called Guttmann–Prónai house), which also served as the headquarters of Prónai's law firm.

== The Holocaust ==
Following the German occupation of Hungary on 19 March 1944, Prónai was appointed head of the newly established Judenrat in Békéscsaba. Local rabbi Ödön Szabó described him as an "ultra assimilant lawyer" in his memoir. Around the same time, on 20 March, his daughter was arrested by Hungarian police, when she intended to travel from Budapest to Békéscsaba. Prónai corresponded intensively with the Central Jewish Council in order to free his daughter. He also lobbied to be elected to the central council as a member, as a representative of the countryside. Jewish leader Samu Stern promised that he would do everything he could to free the girl from the German and Hungarian authorities. In order to satisfy Nazi demands, Prónai collected the previous year's tax arrears in April 1944, referring to the Jewish council.

The Jews of Békéscsaba were interned and collected to the local tobacco factory. Between 24 and 26 June 1944, over 3,000 Jews were sent to Auschwitz. Prónai and his wife were among them, they were immediately sent to the gas chambers after their arrival on 29 June 1944. Their daughter Anna survived the concentration camp.

== Sources ==
- Veszprémy, László Bernát (2021). "Kik vezették a vidéki zsidó tanácsokat? [Who led the rural Jewish councils?]". Múlt és Jövő (Új folyam) (in Hungarian). 32 (1): 101–117. ISSN 0864-8646.
