= Ödön Antl =

Jewish council member in Hungary

Member of the National Assembly
- In office 4 November 1945 – 31 August 1947

Personal details
- Born: 31 March 1898 Felsőmocsolád, Austria-Hungary
- Died: 21 December 1976 (aged 78) New York City, United States
- Party: FKGP (1930–1947)
- Profession: businessman, politician

Ödön Antl (31 March 1898 – 21 December 1976) was a Hungarian Jewish merchant and politician. He was head of the Jewish Council (Judenrat) of Kaposvár during the Holocaust. He was a Member of Parliament of the Independent Smallholders' Party (FKGP) from 1945 to 1947. He emigrated to the United States.

== Early life ==
Ödön Antl was born into a wealthy merchant Orthodox Jewish family in Felsőmocsolád, Somogy County on 31 March 1898, as the son of Mór Antl and Hermina Pfeifer. He graduated from a trade school in 1915. During World War I, he was drafted in 1916. He demobilized as a reserve first lieutenant in 1918. He married Erzsébet Ring, daughter of a wealthy entrepreneur Lipót Ring, in 1923. Taking over his father-in-law's business, Antl worked as a timber merchant. His company exported a significant amount of wood to Germany and the Netherlands. Beside that, he farmed on a 642-acre land lease (437 kh. arable land). By the 1930s, he and his wife were among the wealthiest residents of Kaposvár. He was involved in a corruption scandal in 1930, for which he was arrested and imprisoned for two days in 1930.

Antl was politically active in Somogy County. He founded the local branch of the National Smallholders and Agrarian Workers Party (OKGFP) and was a vocal supporter of the policy of its national leader István Szabó de Nagyatád in 1918. Antl belonged to the party's liberal wing. Representing OKGFP, he became a member of the legislature of Somogy County and was a senior official of the county's economic association. He protested against the atrocities of the White Terror in 1920. He joined the newly formed Independent Smallholders' Party (FKGP) in 1930.

== The Holocaust and aftermath ==
Following the German invasion of Hungary in March 1944, local authorities established a Jewish council (Judenrat) in Kaposvár, as elsewhere in Hungary. Mayor György Kaposváry appointed Jenő Mittelman, a Neolog Jew and wealthy pharmacist, and Ödön Antl, an Orthodox Jew, as co-presidents of the council. By early June, Antl remained sole head of the council, because Mittelman fled to Budapest. In the same month, Antl was recruited to labour service, while his wife and sister were deported, along with the entire Jewish population in Kaposvár. Antl lost several family members during the Holocaust, but his wife survived the Auschwitz concentration camp. In December 1944, when the Red Army reached the area, the Jewish council was re-organized with the leadership of Antl, to assist the forced labourers from Jewish property.

After the end of the World War II, Antl became a member of the verification committee in Somogy County, which investigated the activity of the local political elite during the war years. He was also elected president of the local Orthodox Jewish congregation in Kaposvár, holding the position from 1945 to 1948. Beside that, he headed the 9th district of the Orthodox Israelite Central Office (OIKI) too. Shortly after the end of the war and the Soviet occupation of Hungary, in June 1945, a file was opened in the case of Ödön Antl, who had economic connections in Germany as a timber merchant and, according to the indictment, took an active role in Hungary's entry into the World War II. The charges, however were quickly dropped. As a member of FKGP, he was elected a member of parliament via the Somogy County party list in the 1945 Hungarian parliamentary election. He spoke out against the Kunmadaras pogrom in his only parliamentary speech in August 1946. He lost his parliamentary seat in the 1947 Hungarian parliamentary election. He was member, then head of the National Jewish Restoration Committee from 1948 to 1949.

== Emigration ==
Antl fled Hungary with the assistance of the American Jewish Joint Distribution Committee (JDC) in 1950. Initially, he resided in Salzburg, where he participated in helping refugees. He was a member of the Hungarian National Council (Hungarian: Magyar Nemzeti Bizottmány; MNB), an organization of emigrants, between 1950 and 1957. He left Austria for Argentina in 1951. He wrote articles for Hatikva, a journal of the Hungarian Jews in Buenos Aires. He lived in La Serena, Chile by 1961, where he operated a copper mine and became a millionaire. Beside MNB, he took part in various emigrant organizations, for instance, he was a board member of the Hungarian Peasant Association Emigration Organization, vice-chair of the National Association of Hungarian Jews, co-president of the World Federation of Hungarian Jews and president of the Association of the Former Hungarian Forced Laborers and Deportees from 1963.

He moved to New York City by 1965. In that year, he established a $100,000 scholarship, naming after his late brother Imre Antl, for medical students in Israel. He was considered himself a Zionist and spoke against the "Arab danger". Antl and his wife celebrated their 50th wedding anniversary at 75 Rockefeller Plaza in 1973, many expatriate Hungarian politicians took part in the event, including Béla Varga, Imre Kovács and Béla Király. Antl died in New York City on 21 December 1976, at the age of 78. He was buried in Israel in March 1977.

== Sources ==
- Veszprémy, László Bernát (2021). "Kik vezették a vidéki zsidó tanácsokat? [Who led the rural Jewish councils?]". Múlt és Jövő (Új folyam) (in Hungarian). 32 (1): 101–117. ISSN 0864-8646.
- Veszprémy, László Bernát (2023). Tanácstalanság. A zsidó vezetés Magyarországon és a holokauszt, 1944–1945 [Bereft of Council. Jewish leadership in Hungary during the Holocaust in 1944–1945] (in Hungarian). Budapest: Jaffa Kiadó. ISBN 978-963-475-731-3.
