= Ákos Kolos =

Jewish council member in Hungary

- Born: Ákos Klein; 9 February 1888; Kassa, Austria-Hungary (present-day Košice, Slovakia)
- Died: 1956 (aged 67–68); Budapest, Hungary
- Known for: head of the Judenrat in Košice
- Spouse: Erzsébet Szepesi (m. 1921; died 1956)

Ákos Kolos (né Klein; 9 February 1888 – 1956) was a Hungarian Jewish lawyer and politician. He chaired the Judenrat in Košice (Kassa) during the Holocaust.

== Early life ==
Ákos Kolos was born as Klein in Kassa, Austria-Hungary (present-day Košice, Slovakia) on 9 February 1888, the son of Lipót Benjámin Klein and Etel Kleinmann. He graduated from the State Technical School of Kassa, then studied law. He was working as a lawyer by 1916, when he was drafted into the Austro-Hungarian Army during World War I. He fought at the Eastern and Italian fronts. When he was wounded, he was deployed and was awarded Karl Troop Cross.

After the dissolution of Austria-Hungary, his birthplace and residence Košice belonged to Czechoslovakia. He married Erzsébet Szepesi (or Szepessi) in 1921. They had three children, Bálint, Judit and Ádám, who were born between 1922 and 1929. Kolos functioned as principal of the local Israelite elementary school from around 1930 to 1933, when he resigned. During that time, he advocated anti-Zionist standpoint and emphasized that "the place of the indigenous Jews today must be in the camp of the Hungarians, since the Hungarian feeling was instilled in them from the beginning". He joined the Hungarian National Party, and served as vice-president of the party branch in Košice around 1932. He objected against the Czechoslovak school reform, which violated religious educational autonomy, in 1934, therefore, he was prosecuted on charges of sedition against the state, but the case ended with his acquittal.

In accordance with the First Vienna Award, signed in November 1938, Košice (Kassa) became again part of the Kingdom of Hungary. Kolos was elected president of the local Neolog Jewish congregation in July 1943, replacing Ignác Hercz. In this capacity, Kolos called for the support of the labor servicemen and commemorated the death of Deputy Regent István Horthy.

== During the Holocaust ==
The Nazi Germany invaded Hungary in March 1944. Days after the occupation, Kolos attended that general meeting of the Jewish leaders in Budapest, where the Central Jewish Council was established upon the demand of the German authorities. Returning to his birthplace, the local Jewish council was also established under the leadership of Kolos around 27 March 1944. As a rare example of information method, the Jewish council under Kolos published its own Hungarian-language gazette Kassai Zsidó Tanács Közleményei. Its first published issue (27 March) informed the Jews about the formation of the council and its members. The second issue (3 April) urged the Jews to maintain order and calm, and requested them not visit the members of the Jewish council at their private homes, since "en masse" requests are coming from local Jews, mainly for travel permits, as the gazette reported.

Kolos tried to maintain constant contact with the Central Jewish Council in Budapest. For instance, he sent a letter to László Bakonyi, secretary-general of the National Office of Israelites of Hungary (MIOI) in the case of an interned rabbi student for his release on 3 April. He instructed his deputy Artúr Görög, a right-wing Zionist, to keep in touch with the local mayor's office on 25 April. On the next day, Kolos personally asked the mayor for the confiscated Jewish wealth, to finance the food of the Jews, who were interned and collected to the local brickyard before their deportation. He sought to ensure the camp's water supply in a similar way on 7 May. The deportation of Jews in Kassa to the Auschwitz concentration camp began on 15 May 1944.

In a letter dated 28 May, Kolos wrote that the Jewish council was abolished. Kolos obtained an exemption certificate for himself and his family, so they avoided deportation. By July, Kolos stayed in Budapest. He survived the Holocaust and the siege of Budapest. He died in 1956.

== Sources ==
- Veszprémy, László Bernát (2021). "Kik vezették a vidéki zsidó tanácsokat? [Who led the rural Jewish councils?]". Múlt és Jövő (Új folyam) (in Hungarian). 32 (1): 101–117. ISSN 0864-8646.
