= Freiberg subcamp =

Freiberg was a subcamp of Flossenbürg concentration camp located in Freiberg, Saxony.

== History of the camp ==
In Freiberg in December 1943, preparations began for a subcamp of KZ Flossenbürg to house an outside detail at the Arado Flugzeugwerke (Arado Aircraft Factory). The planning and construction of the subcamp is an example of the collaboration between the armaments industry, the SS, and the Ministry of Armaments. The SS approved the application for the allocation of a prisoner work-detail that Arado had submitted within the context of the Jägerstab's (Fighter Staff) measures. In its building application, Arado was represented by a building commissioner of the Reich Ministry for Armaments and War Production (RMfRuK) based in Dresden. The Reich Industry Group (the lobbying organization for the armaments industry) for the Land of Saxony, Regional Office Dresden, undertook the planning of the subcamp.

Bureaucratic hurdles delayed the construction of the subcamp. When the first transport arrived on August 31, 1944, the barracks were not yet complete and the prisoners had to be lodged in the empty halls of a former porcelain factory.

According to concurring reports from many of the prisoners, they were personally selected at Auschwitz by Josef Mengele for deportation to Freiberg. He decided who went on the transport, who stayed at the Auschwitz-Birkenau camp, and who was to be murdered immediately.

When the female prisoners were transferred to the still unfinished barracks in December 1944, they faced considerably worse living conditions. With bare feet and inadequate clothing, they were forced daily to walk half an hour in deep snow to the factory. Some also had to go to the Hildebrand munitions factory. The cold and wet concrete barracks, the brutality of the SS female guards, the physically draining work, and malnourishment soon claimed the lives of a number of prisoners. Though only five deaths were recorded in SS documents, the actual number may be higher.

Women who arrived at Freiberg pregnant and whose condition became apparent once they were there suffered especially. Priska Loewenbein (Lomova), a Slovak prisoner, gave birth to her daughter Hana on April 12, 1945, two days before Freiberg was evacuated. Other women gave birth during the evacuation transport or shortly after arriving at Mauthausen.

In addition to Hana, at least two more babies were born during the transport to Mauthausen. The three survived, much later learned of each other, and met at a 65th anniversary memorial at Mauthausen. If there were other babies, their fate is unknown. All three mothers survived to old age; in early 2012, one was still living in England at age 95, frail but with a clear, lively mind. None of the three fathers survived the war. Historians have found evidence that of the approximately one thousand women who began in Freiberg, about one hundred and twenty five definitely left Mauthausen alive. Possibly double that number actually survived, but starvation, disease and cold conditions claimed the majority.

The American soldiers (most from Patton's 3rd Army, mainly of the 11th Armored Division (Thunderbolts)) who liberated Mauthausen on May 5, 1945, were unprepared for what they found, but they quickly moved to help the sick and wounded. One young medic, Leroy Petersohn, age 22, a newspaper employee back home in Aurora, Illinois, not only provided medical help and supplies, but also some exceptional documentation. Within a week of arriving at Mauthausen he got use of a typewriter and made an extensive record of his observations. He also took numerous pictures and later gathered documents and artefacts. He gave valuable eyewitness testimony for people who had doubts about the facts of the concentration camps. Petersohn, members of his family and many members of the Thunderbolts befriended survivors of Mauthausen and formed a lifelong bond with them. Petersohn died in 2010, but he touched many lives in a quiet, heroic way. His writings and memorabilia are some of the clearest eyewitness reports touching on the above subjects. There were many thousands of prisoners at the Mauthausen liberation. This is just about the women transported from Freiberg.

Female SS guards, some of whom were recruited from the Freiberg area and some of whom came with the prisoners from Auschwitz, supervised the women. SS Unterscharfuehrer Richard Beck was in command at the camp and oversaw 27 SS Unterfuehrer and SS men, in addition to the females guards.

After work was halted on March 31, 1945, the prisoners at Freiberg were left on their own in the barracks. Food rations were reduced.

== Prison demographics ==
The first transport arrived on August 31, 1944, with 249 primarily Polish Jewish women and girls from Auschwitz—whom the Flossenbürg commandant assigned prisoner numbers 53,423 through 53,671.

The second transport arrived on September 22, 1944, with 251 women from Auschwitz, also primarily Polish Jews, who were assigned prisoner numbers 53,672 through 53,922. The third transport was registered on October 12, 1944, delivering 501 Jewish women and girls—assigned prisoner numbers 53,923 through 54,171; 54,187 through 54,335 and 56,801 through 56,803—to Freiberg. This transport included 183 Czechs, 158 Slovaks, 90 Germans, 25 stateless persons, 23 Dutch, 14 Hungarians, 6 Poles, 1 Serbian, and 1 American. Additionally there was a Russian female doctor assigned with prisoner number 59,939.

The fact that the prisoners from each of the three transports were assigned consecutive numbers indicates that the transports were completely coordinated with the Flossenbürg main camp beforehand. In total, there were 1,002 women assigned to the outside detail at Freiberg. A strength report on January 31, 1945, still listed 996 women in the Freiberg camp.

== Literature ==
Cziborra, Pascal. KZ Freiberg. Geheime Schwangerschaft. Lorbeer Verlag. Bielefeld 2008. ISBN 978-3-938969-05-2

== Survivor testimony ==
Hana L., a Czech prisoner, reported:

They always assembled in groups of five, followed by the high SS marching by in their perfect uniforms. It was Dr. Mengele personally who sorted the people into those capable of work and prisoners destined for gassing. As we were both dressed in a good coat and an anorak, he signaled my cousin Vera and me to the right and my mother to the left, which meant to the gas. ...My mother said in good German, 'Please, these are my children.' Mengele now also signaled my mother to the right. We did not suspect that to the right meant work and life and to the left meant gas and death. ...But the great miracles were still to come. They took all of our things away, shaved our hair, and everyone received a dress and wooden clogs or other shoes. ...Until I die I will never forget the feeling of the cold on my shaved head. Without hair -- that is a complete degradation for a woman. We were so many that the SS did not manage to tattoo all of us. ...Still in October we were put on a transport toward Germany. That was like a prize. Thus we reached Freiberg in Saxony.

In contrast to the wretched barracks in the women's camp at Auschwitz-Birkenau, the lodgings at the factory in Freiberg—which were heated and, to some extent, dry—appeared considerably better to the women. Anneliese W., then 16 years old, said of the barracks: "It appeared to be a good change from Auschwitz. We slept only two to a bed, had pillows and a type of blanket."

Several women reported on the employment, such as Katarina L., a Slovak prisoner: "We worked in two shifts, 12 hours each, as heavy laborers building airplane wings. As we were not skilled workers in aircraft construction, we also made mistakes, which were answered with slaps in the face."

Marie S., a Czech, described the relationship between the prisoners and the German civil workers:

My work consisted mostly of riveting the 'small wing' with another female prisoner. There was no foreman around, only an inspector who came by daily to check whether we had worked well. Once I asked him where we were. To be sure[,] he answered me, but only briefly, ['I]n Freiberg['] and added that he was forbidden to speak with gypsies. When I then said to him that I was a pharmacist and my husband was a doctor, he convinced himself with the help of medications that I had not lied. He then muttered, 'The fascists have deceived me.' After that he always told us what was reported from London.

Hana St., another Czech prisoner, recounted a similar exchange:

This conversation appears strange, almost like a joke, but I find it very instructive as it is probably something like a reflection of the foggy thinking, brought about by the Nazi propaganda haze, of so many 'little people' in Germany at that time. …This dialogue with Foreman Rausch took place in the first days: with hand motions and no words he sent me to get some tool, but I didn't bring the right one. Furious, he grabbed me by the dress and beat me against the scaffolding. I was indignant and told him that when he wanted something he would have to explain it to me as I had never before worked in a factory. Rausch was surprised that this creature -- resembling a scarecrow -- [had] addressed him, and even in German. He asked me where I had worked and what type of work I had actually done. In another conversation we talked about the concentration camp and I explained to him that I was sent there as a Jew. To that[,] foreman Rausch replied in amazement[,] 'But the Jews are black!' I had blue eyes and[,] despite a shaved head[,] was without doubt a dirty blond[e] with a light complexion. And when I asked him -- I was so impudent -- if he knew what concentration camps are, he answered me[,] 'Yes, that's where various elements are trained to work.' I then informed him that we were brought from Auschwitz to Freiberg. I told him that we all had studied and worked normally and that among us were a number of highly educated women, JDs, PhDs, holders of master's degrees (Magister), doctors, professors, teachers, etc.; that I myself, at that time 23 years old, [had] completed my diploma at a classical high school in 1939 and later worked as a qualified infant nurse and child care professional. Ever since that conversation Foreman Rausch treated me well.

But the testimony Herta B., a German Jew, provided during her witness examination differed greatly: "Zimmerman was the foreman in an airplane factory at Freiberg. …[He] had a group of about twenty prisoners to supervise. He repeatedly abused me physically. He threw shop tools, which I was required to bring him, at my back, or he tore the tool from my hand and beat me with it." The foreman described here is likely the same one about whom other female prisoners reported: "He screamed, 'What, you claim to be a teacher? You piece of dirt!' and once again the hammer flew."

Lisa M., a Czech prisoner, reported on the evacuation: "On April 14, 1945, there was a sudden departure. We were loaded into open cars at the train station and traveled westward into the protectorate, passing train station signs with familiar city names. The nights were cold and sometimes it snowed or rained. Only sometimes did we receive food. En route we encountered similar transports to ours almost daily. Then we had a long stop in Horní Bríza and were transferred into closed cars. The people of the town brought us something to eat. We were supposed to be brought back to our original camp, Flossenbürg. We owe our thanks to a brave station manager who despite threats held up our train. We traveled back in the direction of Budweis. No one knew what happened in the other car. Once a day the car was opened and someone shouted the command '[O]ut with the dead.' We noticed that the train changed direction. On April 29 we stood in the train station at Mauthausen. Half starved we dragged ourselves through the town. At a fountain we wanted to at least drink something, but the locals chased us away und threw stones at us. In the camp we found out rather quickly that the gas chambers were already out of action. Hungarian women who had come there a few days earlier than we did died there. On May 5 we were liberated by the US Army."

== Notes ==
This article incorporates text from the United States Holocaust Memorial Museum, and has been released under the GFDL.
