= Kraków District =

Kraków District Distrikt Krakau
- Coat of arms

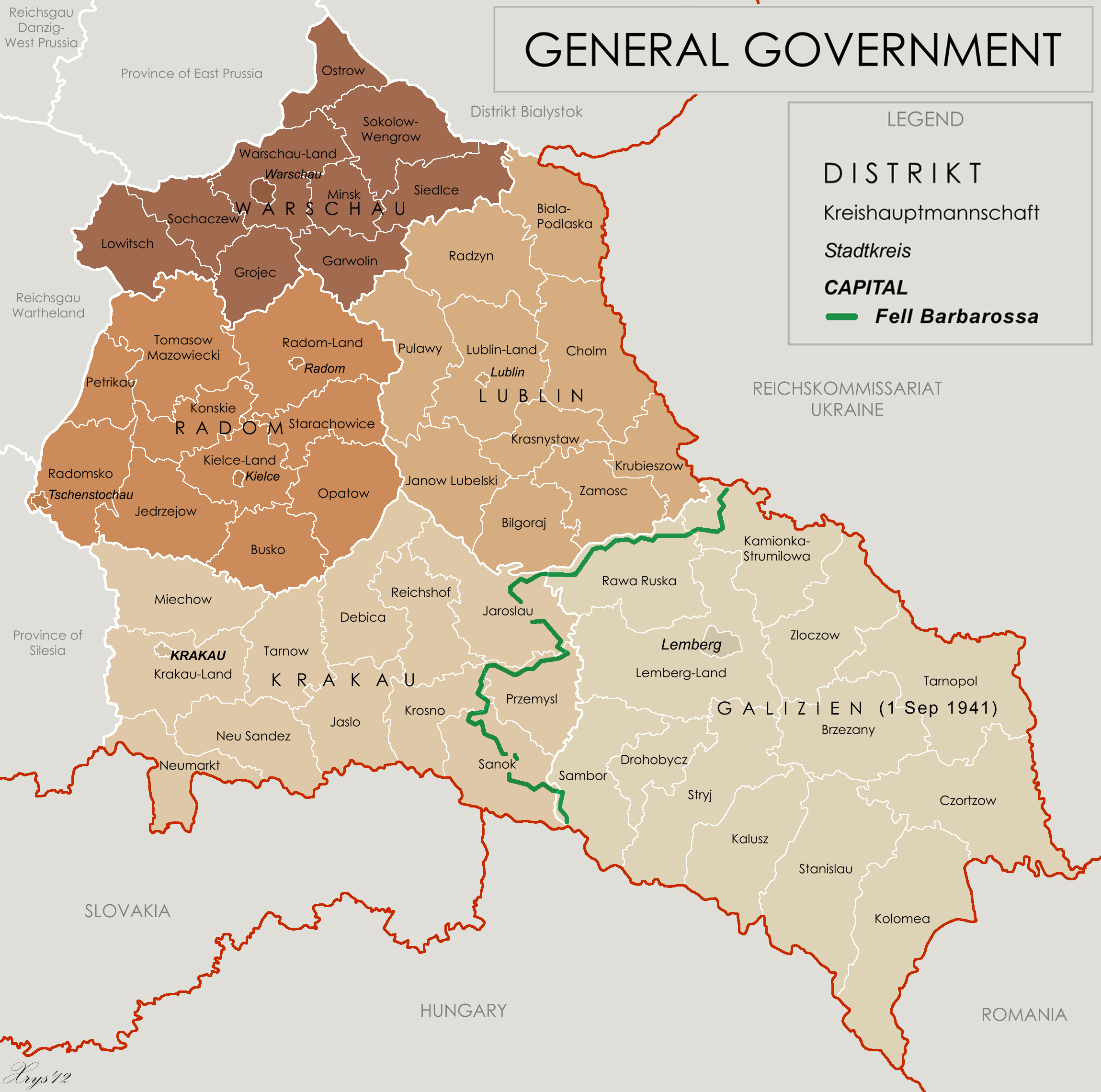
- Administrative map of the General Government in August 1941 following Barbarossa. District of Kraków, lower centre

Kraków District (German: Distrikt Krakau, Polish: Dystrykt krakowski) was one of the original four administrative districts set up by Nazi Germany after the German occupation of Poland during the years of 1939–1945. This district, along with the other three districts, formed the General Government. It was established on October 12, 1939 by Adolf Hitler, with the capital in occupied Kraków – the historic residence of Polish royalty. The Nazi Gauleiter Hans Frank became the Governor-General of the entire territory of the General Government. He made his residence in Kraków at the heavily guarded Wawel castle. Frank was the former legal counsel to the Nazi Party.

== Administration ==
The Kraków District was divided up into 12 Kreise (counties). Each of these Kreise was run by a district chief (German: Kreishauptmann). The 12 Kreise that made up the district included Dębica, Jarosław, Jasło, Krakauland, Krosno, Miechów, Neumarkt, Neu- Sandez, Przemyśl, Reichshof, Sanok, and Tarnow. The fifth district, District of Galicia, was incorporated into the General Government after the beginning of the German invasion of the Soviet Union during Operation Barbarossa.

The main administrative leader was the district governor. The first governor was SS Major General Otto Wächter, who would be succeeded in the following order: Richard Wendler, Ludwig Losacker, and finally Kurt von Burgsdorff. The first German SS and Police Leader (SSPF) was SS-Gruppenführer Karl Zech, succeeded by SS-Oberführer Hans Schwedler, then SS-Oberführer Julian Scherner and, lastly, by SS-Brigadeführer Theobald Thier. The SSPF oversaw various police agencies, such as the Security Police (German: Sicherheitspolizei) and the Order Police (Ordnungspolizei). The Order Police consisted of the Schutzpolizei (Schupo), which handled policing activities in larger cities, and Gendarmerie, which handled policing activities in smaller towns and rural areas. Lastly, the Jewish Police (Jüdischer Ordnungsdienst) oversaw the inner activities of the various ghettos set up throughout the district. Polish Blue Police and the Order Police were responsible for external patrolling of the ghettos. The Commander of local Order Police battalions and SD for District Kraków was SS-Lieutenant Colonel Max Grosskopf.

Once the military gave control over to the German civil administration, various antisemitic laws were passed to strip Jews of their rights and began forced labor for those that were able. Jewish councils (Judenräte) were created by the civil administration to enforce Jewish-related policies that were signed into law. The members of these councils were responsible for the implementation of any orders given to them. The Jewish councils were responsible for organization of forced labor, the collection of taxes and contributions, registration, the enforcement of sanitary regulations, and the organization of welfare and medical services. The Jewish councils were accused to treating refugees horribly and corruption. Members of the councils often tried to bribe German officials into delaying an order. This did not work over the long term as Jewish funds began to dry up fairly quickly. The Jewish Social Self-Help (JSS) eventually took over control of welfare from the Jewish councils. Branches were set up in major Jewish populations throughout the district. The services they provided include setting up soup kitchens, distributed food and clothing that was given to them, and provided care for the elderly and children. Their efforts were not enough to fix all the issues facing the Jewish ghettos.

A little over two months after the invasion of Poland, the new Gestapo chief of Kraków Bruno Müller had launched his Sonderaktion Krakau, shutting down all universities and high schools, and arresting leading academics; eventually killing President of Kraków Dr Stanisław Klimecki.

== Ghettoization ==
The occupation of Kraków by Nazi Germany began on September 6, 1939. Many Jews and civilians alike tried to flee when the German army came, but many were forced to return to the city. On the roads the German soldiers were closing in on and quickly occupying the small towns and villages, and those that fled thought it would be safer to go back to Krakow. The Kraków Ghetto was established on March 3, 1941, followed by a wave of further ghettoization in other towns throughout the district. German statistics estimated that there about 200,000 Jews within the district. This was likely a low estimate as it failed to take in to account the Jews that came from Germany after Poland was incorporated into the Reich. Kraków became the headquarters of Security Police (SIPO) and the SD intelligence agency for Operation Reinhard which marked the most deadly phase of the "Final Solution". The majority of deportations of Jews came within a three-and-a-half month period from June 1 to mid-September 1942. All ghettos were liquidated by February 1944, with Jews either being sent to labor camps or to Bełżec extermination camp. Of the 60,000 Jews that were in Kraków before the war began, around 2,000 survived.

There was organized resistance within the Kraków ghetto. They participated in activities both inside and outside the ghetto. Many pre-war youth groups remained in contact and began to train with weapons, implemented assistance programs, and other various underground activities. The resistance conducted raids in which they killed Gestapo informants, stole uniforms that were produced in factories in the ghetto, and other activities. Outside the ghetto, they assassinated German officers and attacked checkpoints.

== Forced Labor in the Kraków District ==
Much of the forced labor in the Kraków District occurred at Nazi-run concentration camps. Labor was generally coordinated by the Judenrat (Jewish Council). This included separating Jews by able-bodiedness for forced labor and handling any social issues that arose. It was not uncommon for laborers to be sent from labor camps to Nazi extermination camps, particularly to nearby Auschwitz-Birkenau or Bełżec. By 1942, about 37,000 Jews remained in the Kraków District; all of which were confined in either the remaining ghettos, or major labor camps such as Płaszów, Biesiadka, and Pustków, according to the Korherr Report.

The Kraków Ghetto was divided in early December 1942 into Ghetto "A" and Ghetto "B", the former being for laborers, and the latter being for others. This step was a direct preparation for the eventual liquidation of the ghetto. Aktion Krakau (Operation Reinhard in Kraków), led by Amon Göth, carried out the final liquidation in mid-March 1943. Forced labor varied in purpose, but was typically civil, industrial, or agricultural in nature. Many Jews were enslaved in factories or on construction projects, generally under horrible conditions and provided with meager rations.

Two German companies notably utilized Jewish forced labor, Organisation Todt (OT) and Kirchhof, both of which were known to provide inadequate food supplies and wages. Kirchhof had a reputation for mistreating Jewish laborers. The labor performed for both companies often included paving roads, building tunnels, quarrying stone, unloading freight, constructing roads, removing tombstones from Jewish cemeteries, and leveling said cemeteries to create paved public spaces.

The greatest tragedy of the Polish state, was the impossibility of providing its own citizens with protection against the occupiers’ terror. Poland was helpless against the construction of a network of concentration camps within the territory occupied by the Germans. It was not capable of preventing the citizens of the Republic of Poland – Jews and Poles alike – from a slave-like ordeal in the German death factories and Soviet labor camps.

=== Płaszów Concentration Camp ===
The Kraków-Płaszów concentration camp, the second largest camp in the Kraków District, after Auschwitz, was originally constructed as an extension of the Kraków Ghetto, located about 5 km (3.1 mi) southeast of the city center. Wilhelm Kunde, a commander of the SS guard detail, was the overall manager of the Aktion process to liquidate the Kraków Ghetto, and eventually become one of two commandants of the Płaszów camp. Approximately 10,000 Jews were sent to Płaszów immediately after the liquidation of the ghetto.

The Jewish management and police kept their significance and hierarchy within the camp, maintaining ghetto systems and power structures. Guards in Płaszów frequently beat the Jews. Along with laborers being transferred from the ghetto to the camp, many other logistical transfers took place, such as moving machines, raw materials, and equipment for workshops.

In both Płaszów and Mielec, the letters KL (German: Konzentrationslager—concentration camp) were tattooed on the hands of Jews.

=== Biesiadka Labor Camp ===
The Biesiadka labor camp was located about 150 kilometers east of Kraków, not far from Mielec. Not incredibly urban in nature, it has been noted that the majority of the laborers, many from Rzeszów and Jawornik, engaged in more agriculture-based labor, such as cutting down trees.

Jews and Poles were separated from each other in Biesiadka. Upon arrival, they cut beech trees for the German Fischer company and assisted the Müeller company, which was responsible for transporting the trees to Mielec via truck. Similar to many other camps, laborers are Biesiadka received modest meals before and after their work and were treated as prisoners under the supervision of guards. The commander of the camp, Kolis, was known to shoot individual laborers with little warning.

=== Pustków Concentration Camp ===
In April and May 1940, the Waffen-SS established a military training camp in Pustków utilizing Jewish labor. Jews and Poles were enslaved and exploited as forced laborers until 1944 in this camp and many smaller labor camps that were established in its proximity. The Judenrat was required to provide blankets and food for the inmates, and this helped many to survive. Jews in the Pustków camp originated from both small and large towns and villages in Poland, notably Dębica, Brzesko, Brozstek, Kolbuszowa, Ropczyce, and Wieliczka. Some of those sent to Pustków were then transferred to Auschwitz. While not common, some forced laborers were able to return to Dębica from Pustków, enabled by bribes to the Judenrat.

The members of the Judenrat allegedly tried to spare as many Jews as possible from forced labor efforts. Small workshops and factories were established to employ several Jews, which consequently left them exempt from labor conscription. The amount of young, capable, Jewish men who were captured by Germans and sent to Pustków or neighboring Dulcza Mała continued to increase in 1940 despite these efforts.

During March 1942, similar to the fate of other Jewish communities in the Kraków District, all Jews were completely expelled from Mielec. About 750 people were sent to Pustków, and about 500 were murdered in and around the town. In addition, another 3,000 were deported to the Lublin area. In some cases, like the town of Błażowa, several Jews had connections to "fake jobs" that exempt them from being sent to Pustków during the spring of 1942. Some of those sent to the camp, however, were murdered or died from harsh conditions along the way.

== Governors of the Kraków Galizien ==
No.	Portrait	Governor	Took office	Left office	Time in office
1	Otto Wächter	Otto Wächter (1901–1949)	26 October 1939	22 January 1942	2 years, 88 days
2	Richard Wendler	Richard Wendler (1898–1972)	31 January 1942	24 February 1943	1 year, 24 days
3	Ludwig Losacker [de]	Ludwig Losacker (1906–1990)	24 February 1943	10 October 1943	228 days
4	Kurt von Burgsdorff [de]	Kurt von Burgsdorff (1886–1962)	23 November 1943	18 January 1945	1 year, 56 days
