= Kraków Ghetto Jewish Council =

Jewish managerial board in Nazi Germany

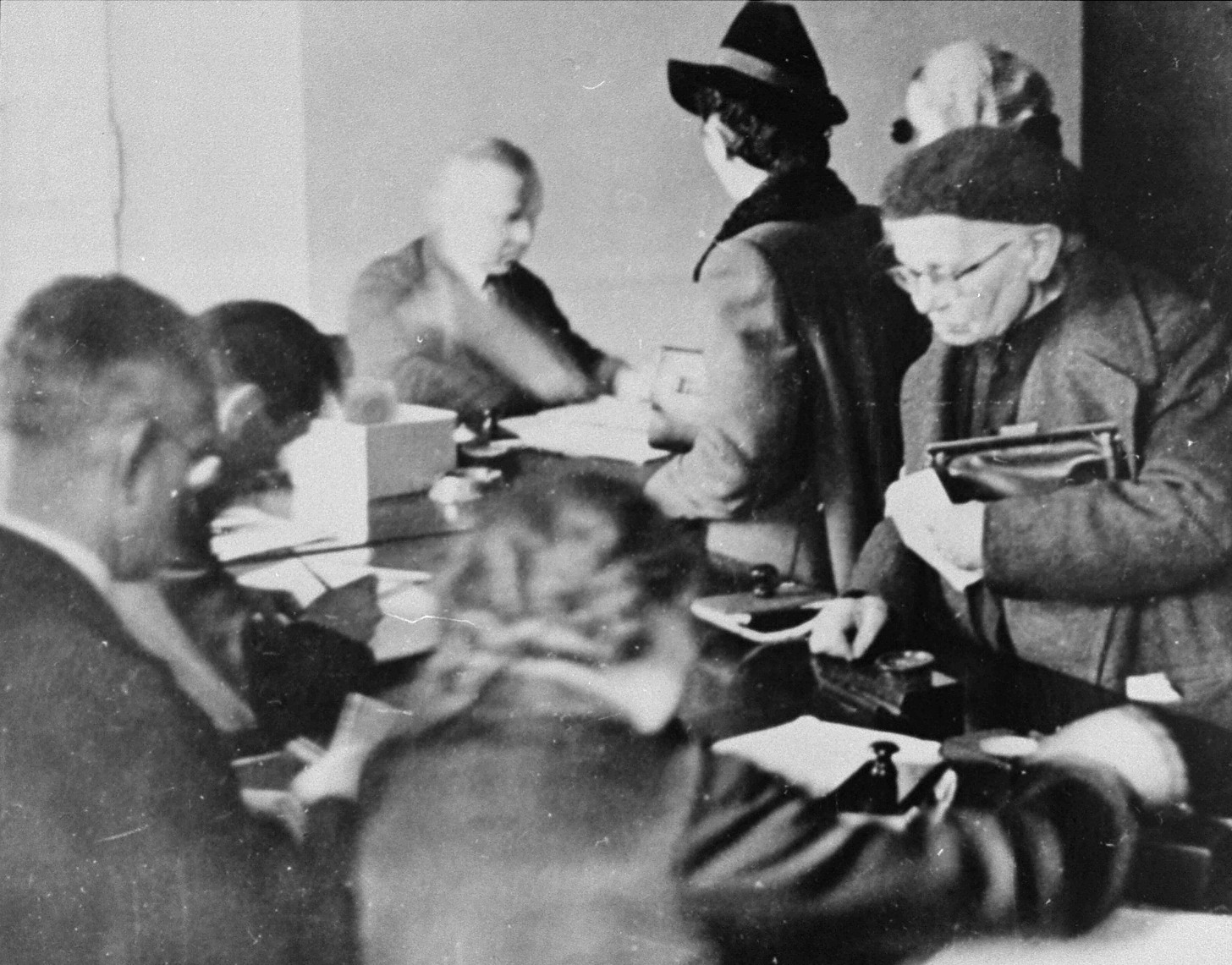
Jews applying for identification and work permits, c. 1941

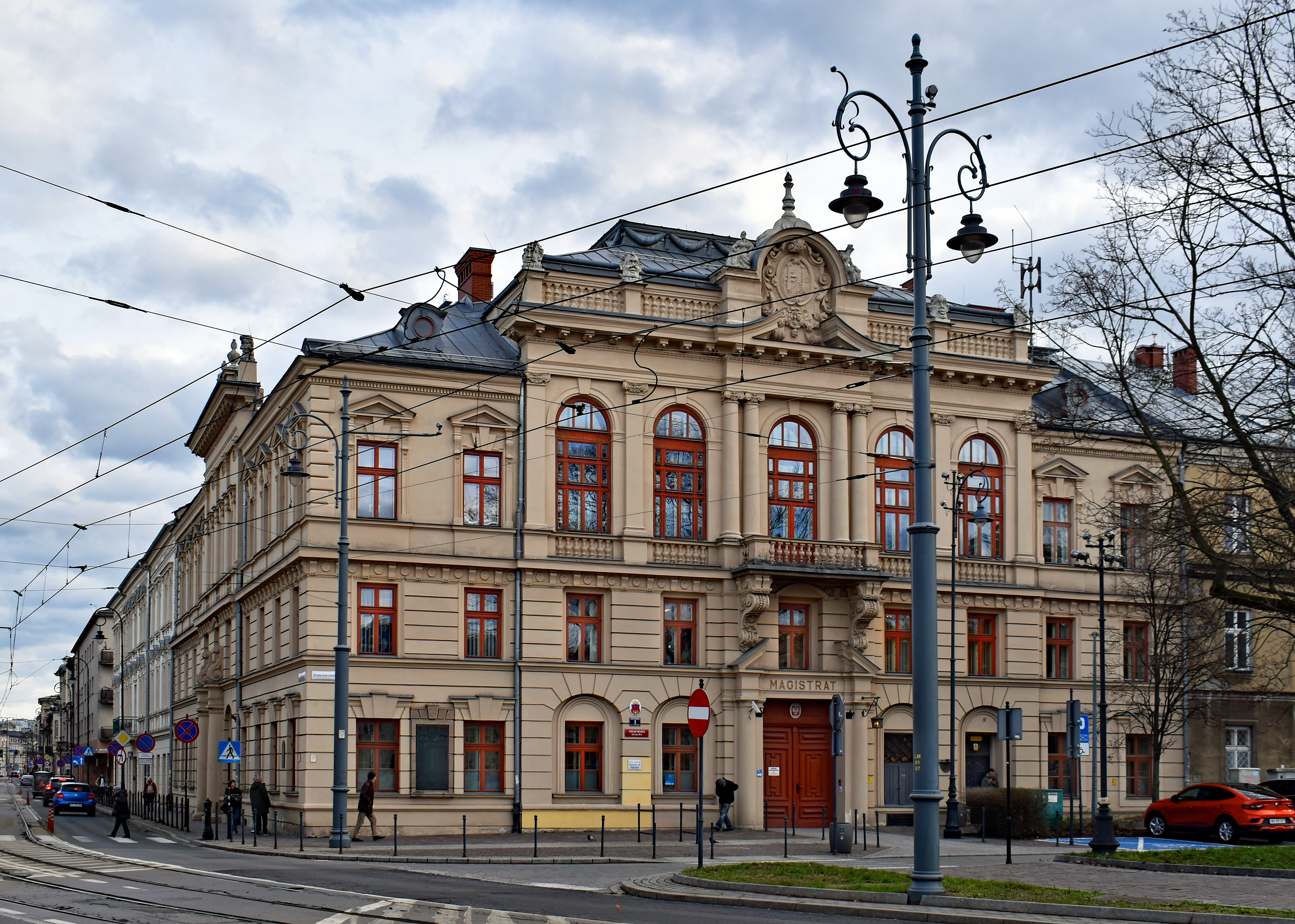
Former town hall of Podgórze, seat of the Judenrat 1 Podgórski Market Square, Kraków

The Kraków Jewish Council (In German: Judenrat) was a 24-person Jewish managerial board formally established in the city of Kraków, Poland by German authorities in December 1939, and later in the Kraków Ghetto when the ghetto was officially formed on March 3, 1941. The Kraków Jewish Council formation was mandated by Nazi administration officials, who demanded that these councils be formed as supervisors of the inmates of their respective ghettos in the General Government, and in other occupied areas. The Jewish Council in Kraków was in direct contact and controlled by Nazi officials on most matters, but had some limited degree of autonomy. The Krakow Jewish council had 19 separate departments that oversaw labor, welfare, health and finance, among other items.

Along with other Jewish Councils in the General Government, the Kraków Jewish Council was established by a general decree from Hans Frank, the governor-general of the General Government, on November 28, 1939, following a statement by Reinhard Heydrich on September 21, 1939, with similar aims . However, the Kraków Ghetto was not formally established in the Podgórze area of the Kraków District until March 3, 1941. Prior to March 3, the offices of the Jewish Council were located at 41 Kraków Street and, after the ghetto was established, the offices were located in the ghetto at the corner of Limanowski and Rynek Podgorski streets. One of the ghetto entrances, often regarded as the 'Gate 1' or 'Main gate' were adjoined to this building. A tram line No. 3 used to pass through this gate, and also trucks with goods, provisions, uniforms for German security guards, and Jews who were taken to work outside the ghetto, used to enter and leave the area by means of this gate next to the Judenrat office. After the arrest of Artur Rosenzweig, the staff moved to Wegierska street 16, while the former building at the corner of Limanowski and Rynek Podgorski was used as a warehouse for things stolen from the deported Jews.

== Organizational structure and functions ==
=== General characteristics ===
The Jewish Councils were created to serve the purposes of the Nazi regime; they had prescribed tasks by the Nazi government and ones in which they took initiative. Isaiah Trunk, author of Judenrat: The Jewish Councils in Eastern Europe under Nazi Occupation believes the tasks of the Jewish Councils, in general, are divided into three classes:

1. Tasks imposed by the authorities, such as conduct of the census of the Jewish population, the supply of forced labor and registration of candidates for a work camp, for deportation, etc.

2. Routine tasks in social welfare, medical care, and in the economic and cultural fields- tasks which were a continuation of prewar communal activities

3. New tasks made essential by the complete elimination of the Jewish population in the ghetto from governmental and municipal services such as food supplies, the management of the ghetto dwellings, industry, health, police and judicial services, etc.

Hans Frank and Reinhard Heydrich separate, but similar decrees defined a Jewish Council as a council of 24 Jews who are elected to their positions by the inhabitants of a particular ghetto. However, for the Kraków Jewish Council, the composition of the council greatly changed because of resignations, arrests and murders, etc. from the first council to when the Kraków Ghetto was liquidated. Local Nazi officials would directly and indirectly change the composition of the Kraków Jewish Council, when they were discontent with a particular action, and the Kraków Ghetto is known to have been greatly disadvantaged by the change in administration. The first chairman of the Kraków Jewish Council was chosen by SS-Oberscharfuhrer Mark Siebert, who ordered that role to be filled by Marek Bilberstein.

While in most cases a particular ghetto's Jewish Council served the inhabitants of that particular ghetto, there was a proposal, made by, and for the Kraków Jewish Council to become a central Jewish Council that would oversee the ghettos in the Kraków district and act on behalf of their interests; however, nothing came of this proposition.

=== Administrative tasks ===
Among the tasks of the Kraków Jewish Council was the establishment of housing in the city of Kraków – and later the Kraków Ghetto – for previous displaced inhabitants of Kraków and impoverished Jewish immigrants from other areas in the General Government and the Greater Reich. In the fall of 1939, the Jewish Council had to find living space for over 8,000 immigrants in the already grossly overpopulated sector of the city. During the Jewish Council's control of the Kraków Ghetto, the Nazi ghetto officials would arbitrarily change the boundaries of the ghetto, further displacing Jews in the ghetto, which made this task for the Jewish Council especially challenging.

As mentioned, the Jewish Council sought out and coordinated housing for immigrants to its community. To highlight the ingenuity of children in the ghettos, despite the horrific conditions, 14-year old Jack Gruener, who arrived with his parents, was told by the Kraków Jewish Council to share a three-bedroom apartment with 12 other people; the lack of privacy was difficult for most families, but Jack later discovered a dwelling for him and his family in the attic of the house they were inhabiting.

Furthermore, The Kraków Jewish Council was ordered to provide a census of the Jewish population in the ghetto that included age, sex and occupation. The Jewish Council was also allowed to establish a post office in the ghetto that the council was allowed to yield a tax from. As Jews were isolated in the ghetto from the surrounding society, the Kraków Jewish Council was also given permission by the German authorities to pass judgement on certain litigation including, but not limited to, mediation between sub-tenants and tenants.

The Kraków Jewish Council was also responsible for taxing the Jews in the ghetto. This was performed by means of a regular tax and an extraordinary tax, where the former refers to a tax that all citizens, whereas the latter refers to specific taxes on items such as birth and wedding certificates and fees for the post office.

== Relationships with other groups in the Kraków Ghetto ==
=== Ghetto police ===
The Kraków Ghetto Jewish Police were responsible for enforcing the decrees of the Nazis and the Jewish Council. Ghetto Jewish police were established on order of Nazi authorities, as with the Jewish councils, however, they were established by local Nazi officials, as opposed to an order from a central Nazi authority, like the decree that established the Jewish Councils. Nazi officials wanted it to appear that Jews initiated the need for a ghetto police, and so they prompted the Kraków Jewish council to ask the local militia captain (stadthauptmann) for permission, and permission was subsequently granted. Furthermore, the Jewish council was involved in choosing the ghetto police and “nepotism and graft” were highly prevalent in the selection. However, soon after the Kraków ghetto police was formed they severed ties with the Jewish Council.

=== Aid organizations ===
There were other Jewish organizations that provided aid within the ghettos, and the Jewish Council would interact with their functionaries. A particular organization, the JSS (Jewish Social Welfare) agency held a conference in September 1940 that brought together the representatives from the Jewish councils of Warsaw, Radom, Lublin, Czestochowa, and Kraków that had the aim of reducing the excessive burden on forced laborers in the various camps.

== Public aid ==
=== Public health ===
Communicable disease was rampant due to the unsanitary conditions of the communities and efforts were made by the Jewish council to limit those disease through public health measures. In February 1940, The Kraków Health Department was established by physicians and run by Dr. Moritz Haber, a council member. A portion of the budget was funded by the council, the rest from voluntary donations. This department oversaw the medical and hygienic care of ghetto shelters (mostly for immigrants) and the other “living section” of the ghetto. The health department also coordinated the work of 156 physicians, 110 aides, along with facilities that included an outpatient clinic, radiology institute, a communicable disease station (as mandated by German authorities), and the only pharmacy in the Kraków Ghetto, although it only provided basic medicines. In September 1940, a mere 36 patients were admitted to the hospital with infectious diseases, which was a result of the measures in place by the Jewish Council. Lastly, to compensate for loss of public health officials, the Jewish Council, in the summer of 1940 operated a training course for hygiene personnel where 63 lectures and a five-day practical course was conducted for education on the fundamentals of hygiene theory.

=== Welfare ===
In the ghettos, there were a few different relief organizations that were involved in welfare operations in the ghettos, such as Jewish Social Welfare (JSS) which worked in the General Government areas, along with the Jewish Councils. However, the JSS welfare in Kraków, and later in the Kraków ghetto was limited because Nazi officials limited the amount of aid they could provide. The Kraków Jewish council provided welfare in the form of soup kitchens, cash payouts and medicine.

== Resistance to German orders ==
Considering the immense power of the Nazi authority and the belief that obedience was the best solution to maintain viability of Jewish life, the Jewish Council complied with most of the Nazi decrees. However, there were certain important instances of resistance. The first council chairman, Marek Biberstein, a teacher and a public activist, was arrested, along with four other council members, for disobeying the expulsion orders of May 1940 to April 1941. Biberstein and two others from the council were sentenced to jail. Furthermore, the second council chairman, Dr. Artur Rosenzweig, was arrested and he and his family were sent to Belzec extermination camp, since Nazi ghetto officials were unhappy with the “number and technique of delivery of people to the assembly square” for the resettlement of June 1942 to extermination and labor camps. Nazi ghetto officials then made David Gutter, the last chairman of the Kraków Ghetto.
