= Jerzy Zakulski =

Soldier executed under Stalinism (1911–1947)

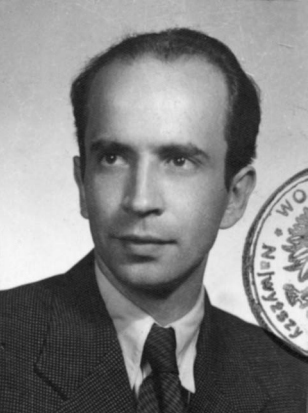
- Zakulski, nom de guerre 'Czarny Mecenas'
- Born: June 28, 1911; Wadowice, Galicia, Austria-Hungary
- Died: July 31, 1947 (aged 36); Mokotów Prison, Warsaw, Polish People's Republic
- Cause of death: Execution by shooting

Second lieutenant Jerzy Zakulski (28 June 1911 – 31 July 1947) was an attorney in interwar Poland, and World War II member of the National Armed Forces (Narodowe Siły Zbrojne, NSZ) in German-occupied Poland. He was sentenced to death and executed by Stalinist officials in Soviet-controlled postwar Poland, on trumped-up charges of being an enemy spy.

== Biography ==
Jerzy Zakulski was born to a family of a high-school teacher, Ludwik Zakulski. The Zakulskis settled in Kraków, at St. Kinga Street 7 in the district of Podgórze. Jerzy enrolled at the Jagiellonian University and graduated with a degree in law in 1936. Two years later he passed the bar. On 1 September 1939 Poland was invaded by Nazi Germany. Zakulski was conscripted into the Polish Army with the reserve military rank of Podporucznik (lieutenant) and took part in the September campaign.

After Poland's defeat Zakulski joined the underground Military Organization Lizard Union (Związek Jaszczurczy) due to his prewar contacts in the Organizacja Polska. In the Podgórze district where he lived, on 3 March 1941 the Nazis created Kraków Ghetto on the orders of Gauleiter Hans Frank. Some 15,000 Jews were removed from their homes in the district of Kazimierz – the main spiritual and cultural centre of Kraków Jewry – and crammed into an area of Podgórze previously inhabited by 3,000 people.

Just before the liquidation of the Ghetto in the course of the murderous Operation Reinhard in Kraków under Holocaust perpetrator Amon Göth, Maria Błeszyńska Bernstein escaped from there at night with her three-year-old daughter. They were rescued by Jerzy Zakulski. He engaged his whole family in the rescue mission including his father-in-law Jan Bahr, hiding Maria and her child in both households by turns. Eventually, they took them out of the city to a safer place of a cousin Zofia Strycharska in Myślenice. Both Maria and her daughter survived the war and returned to Kraków afterwards. In her letter to the Stalinist military court in Warsaw dated 23 June 1947, Maria, living at 32 Długa street at the time, insisted that the Zakulskis had all risked their lives to save theirs.

=== Execution ===
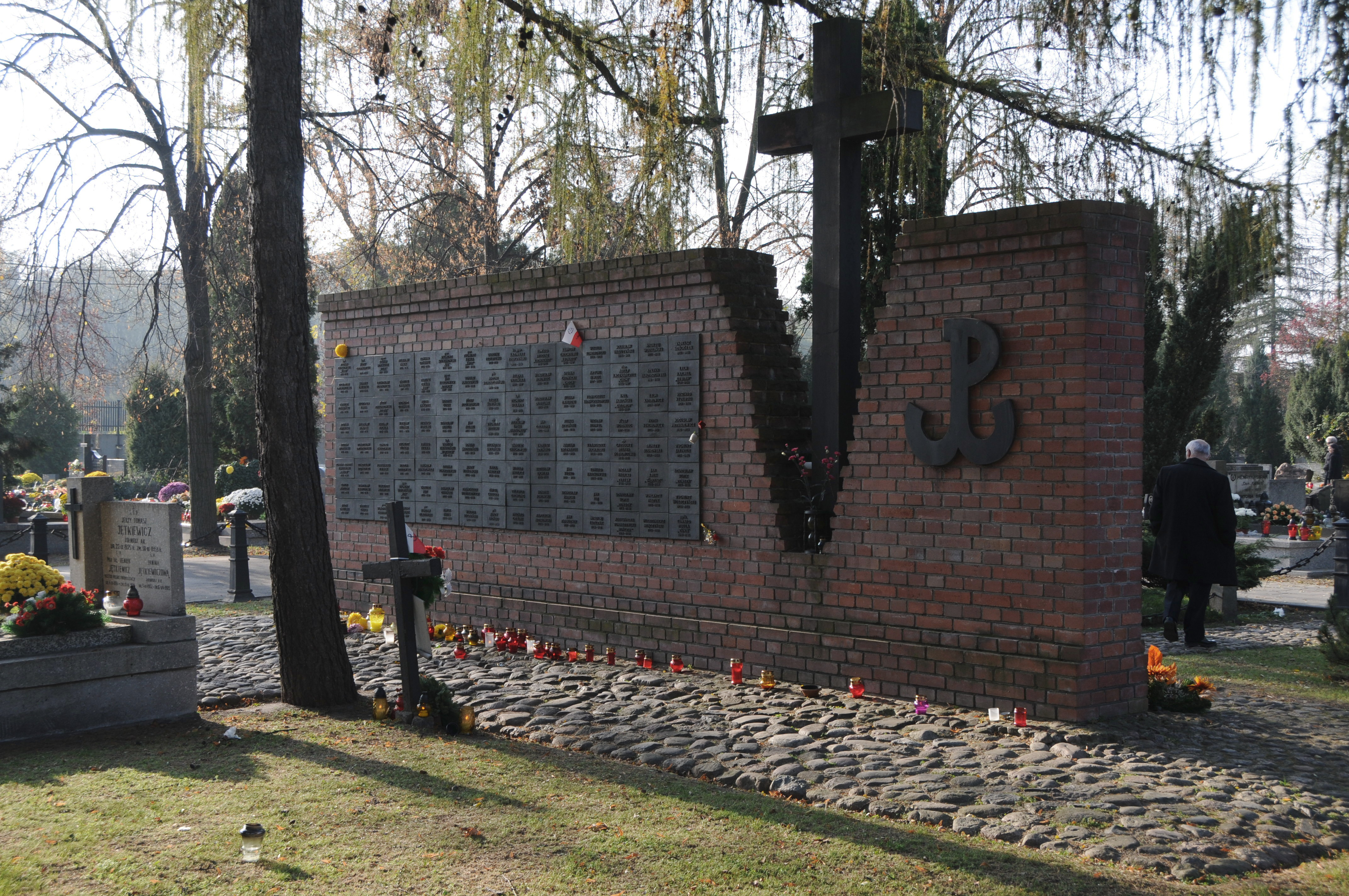
Monument at the Powązki Cemetery featuring the commemorative plaque to Jerzy Zakulski on the mass grave of Cursed soldiers executed in Stalinist Poland in 1945–1956

After the takeover of Kraków by the Red Army, Zakulski continued his clandestine work with the anticommunist Delegatura Sił Zbrojnych na Kraj, collecting data on the Soviet crime wave and looting of the city. He was betrayed and captured by the security forces a year later along with several others. His trial began on 29 May 1947 in Warsaw and concluded after two weeks on 16 June 1947.

A Jewish Holocaust survivor from Kraków, Maria Błeszyńska née Bernstein, attempted to save Zakulski's life in gratitude for his rescue of her and her daughter during the Holocaust in Poland; however, she was unsuccessful. The certified letter she sent to the Regional Military Court in Warsaw was thrown out, along with his plea for presidential mercy.

Zakulski was sentenced to death and shot in prison on 31 July 1947. The Volume 3 of his court case concerning brutal interrogation by the Department of Ministry of Public Security (Poland),^{[pg.55]} headed by Col. Józef Różański, was destroyed.
