= Kraków Ghetto =

Nazi ghetto in Poland

Coordinates: 50°2′43″N 19°57′17″E

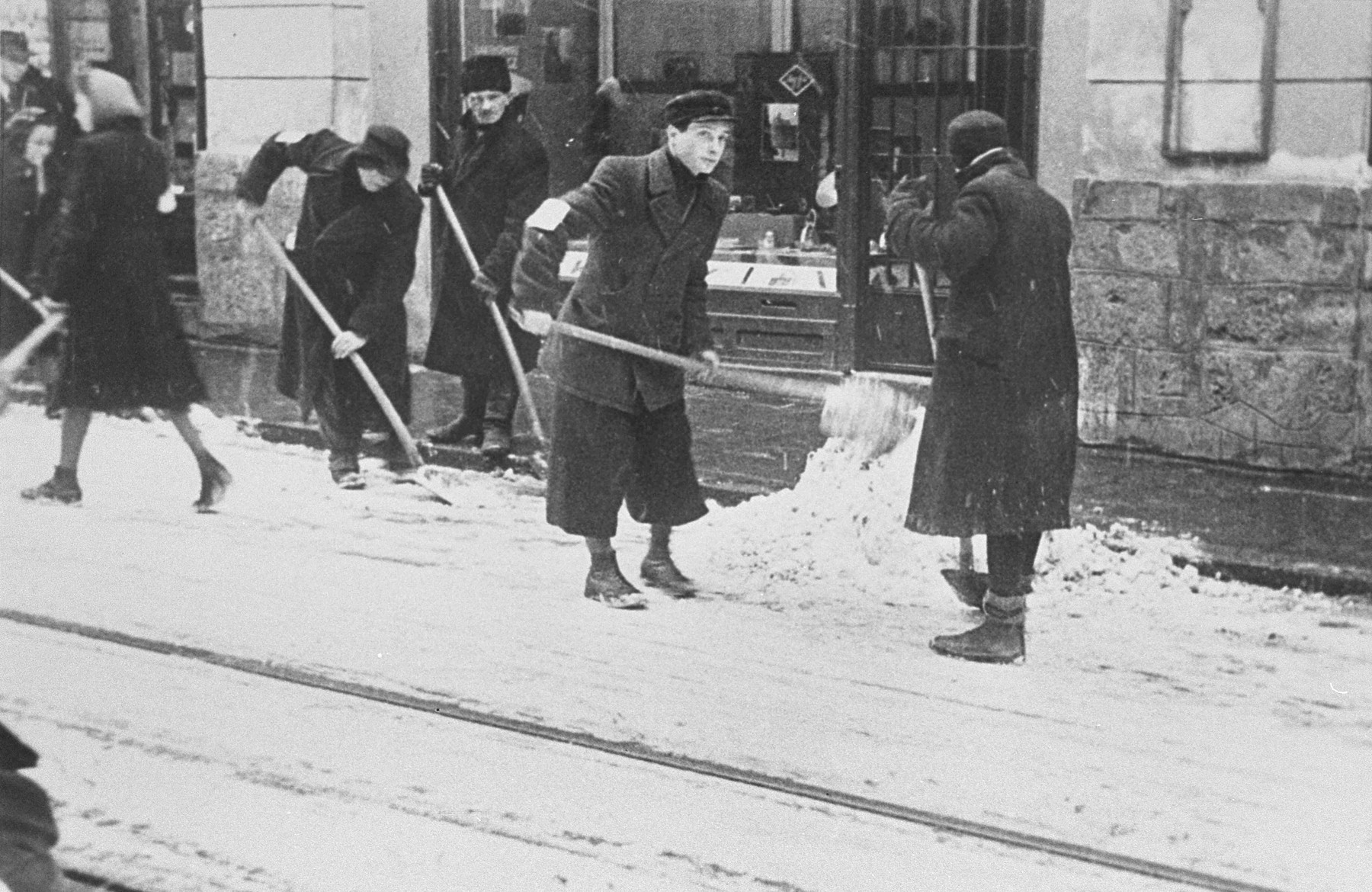
- Jews forced to shovel snow in the street, circa 1940

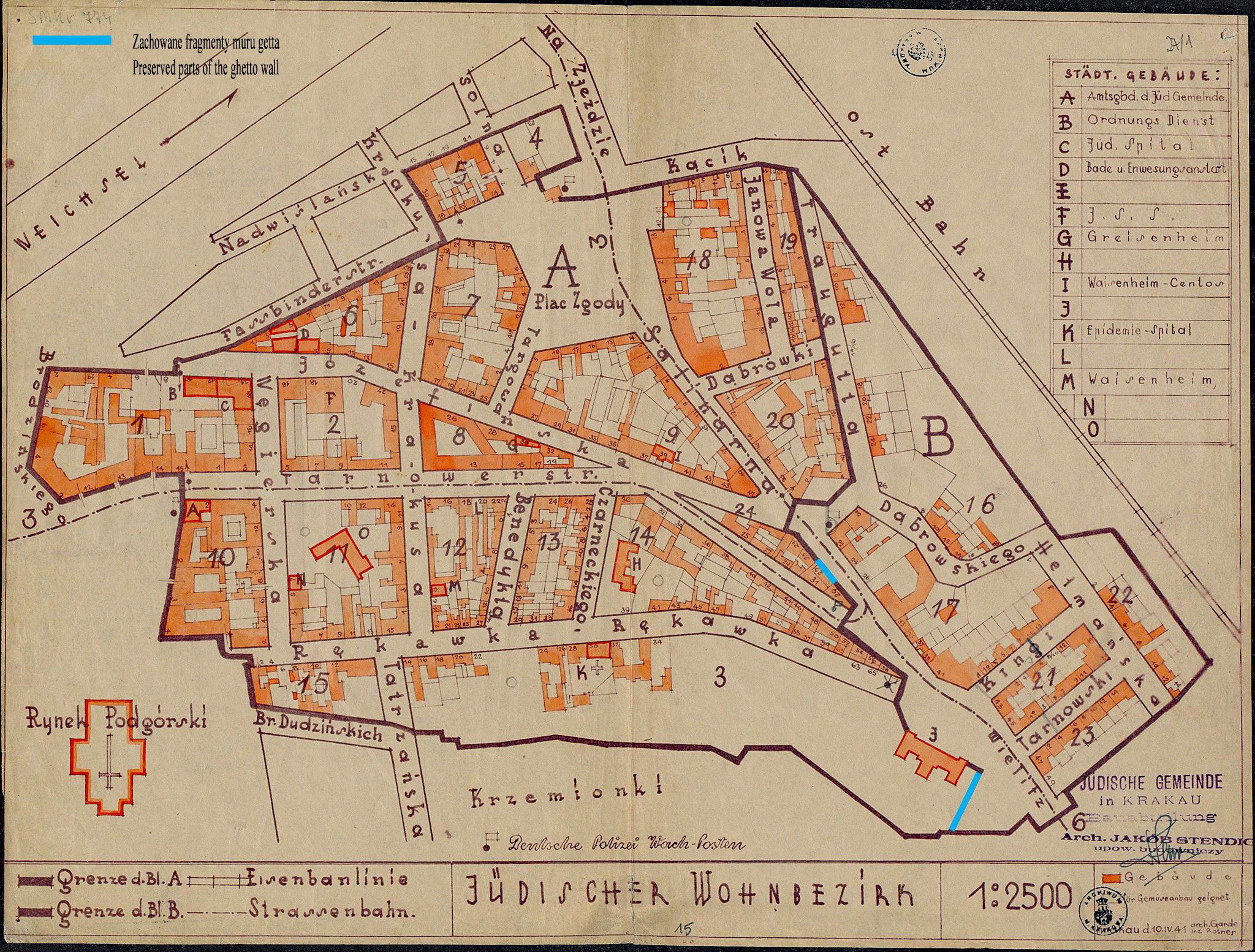
- German Map of Jewish Ghetto in Krakow, April 1941. The preserved fragments of the ghetto wall is marked.

Designations

Historic Monument of Poland
- Designated: 1994-09-08
- Part of: Kraków historical city complex
- Reference no.: M.P. 1994 nr 50 poz. 418

The Kraków Ghetto (Polish: Getto krakowskie, Yiddish: קראָקעווער געטאָ, romanized: Krokewer Geto), officially named the Jewish Residential District in Krakow (German: Der jüdische Wohnbezirk in Krakau), was one of five major metropolitan Nazi ghettos created by Germany in the new General Government territory during the German occupation of Poland in World War II. It was established for the purpose of exploitation, terror, and persecution of local Polish Jews. The ghetto was later used as a staging area for separating the "able workers" from those to be deported to extermination camps in Operation Reinhard. The ghetto was liquidated between June 1942 and March 1943, with most of its inhabitants deported to the Belzec extermination camp as well as to Płaszów slave-labor camp, and Auschwitz concentration camp, 60 kilometres (37 mi) rail distance.

== Background ==
Before the German-Soviet invasion of 1939, Kraków was an influential centre for the 60,000–80,000 Polish Jews who had lived there since the 13th century. Persecution of the Jewish population of Kraków began immediately after the German troops entered the city on 6 September 1939 in the course of the German aggression against Poland. Jews were ordered to report for forced labour beginning in September 1939. In November, all Jews twelve years or older were required to wear identifying armbands. Throughout Kraków, synagogues were closed and all their relics and valuables confiscated by the Nazi authorities.

Kraków was made the capital of the General Government (the part of occupied Poland not directly incorporated into Germany), and by May 1940 the German occupation authority headed by the Governor-General Hans Frank announced that Kraków should become the "racially cleanest" city in the General Government. Massive deportations of Jews from the city ensued. Of the more than 68,000 Jews in Kraków at the time of the German invasion, only 15,000 workers and their families were permitted to remain. All other Jews were ordered out of the city, to be resettled into surrounding rural areas of the General Government.

== Formation of the Kraków Ghetto ==
Map of the Holocaust in Poland including German death camps marked with skulls, and Jewish ghettos in German-occupied Poland marked with red-gold stars.

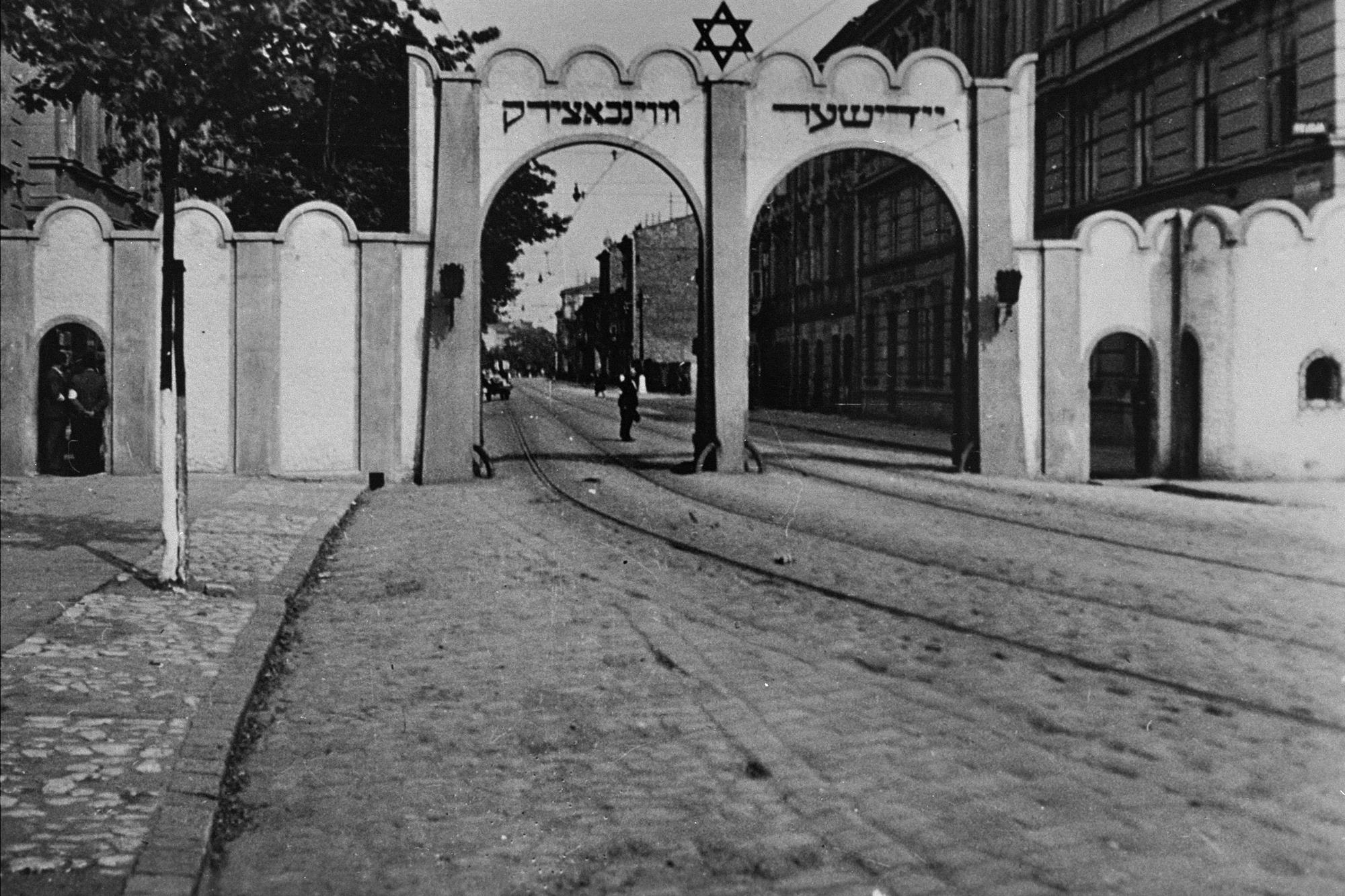
Ghetto main gate. Limanowskiego Street, view from Podgórski Market Square (from W).

In April 1940, Hans Frank proposed the removal of 50,000 Jews from the city of Kraków. Frank's reason for removing Jews from the Jewish quarter was that the area "...will be cleansed and it will be possible to establish pure German neighborhoods..." within Kraków. From May 1940 to 15 August 1940, a voluntary expulsion program was enacted. Jews that chose to leave Kraków were allowed to take all of their belongings and relocate throughout the General-Government (Generalgouvernement). By 15 August 1940, 23,000 Jews had left Kraków. After this date, mandatory expulsions were enforced. On 25 November 1940, the Order for the Deportation of Jews from the Municipal District of Kraków was announced. This order declared that no more Jews were allowed into the city of Kraków, Jews residing in Kraków required a special permit, and locations outside of Kraków that Jews were forced to move to were chosen by authorities. Jews forced to leave were also only allowed to bring along 25 kg (62½ lbs.) of their belongings when they left. By 4 December 1940, 43,000 Jews were removed from Kraków, both voluntarily and involuntarily. Jews that were still residing in Kraków at this time were deemed "...economically useful..." and they had to obtain a residence permit that "...had to be renewed each month."

The following year, on 3 March 1941, the establishment of the Kraków Ghetto was ordered by Otto Wächter. The ghetto was to be set up in the Podgórze District of Kraków. Podgórze was chosen as the site of the ghetto instead of the traditional Jewish quarter, Kazimierz, because Hans Frank believed Kazimierz was more significant to the history of Kraków. Podgórze was a suburb of Kraków at the time. Wächter claimed that formation of the ghetto was necessary for public health and order. The Kraków ghetto was officially established on 20 March 1941. When relocating to the ghetto, Jews were only allowed to bring 25 kg of their belongings. The rest of their possessions were taken by the German Trust Office (Treuhandstelle). Some Jews were resettled to the nearby ghetto of Brzesko. All non-Jewish residents of the area were required to relocate in other districts by 20 March 1941.

The ghetto was guarded by the German police (Schutzpolizei), the Polish police (Blue Police), and the Kraków Ghetto Jewish Police (Jüdischer Ordnungsdienst – OD), but the only police force inside the ghetto was the Jewish Police. With the formation of the ghetto, the OD had an office established at Józefińska Street 37 in Podgórze. In April 1941, the ghetto was enclosed by a wall made of barbed wire and stone; the stones used were designed to look like tombstones, but also included "...Jewish monuments and tombstones from the cemetery." The ghetto wall was constructed using Jewish forced labor. The ghetto was accessible by three entrances: one near the Podgórze Market, Limanowskiego Street, and the Plac Zgody. The Kraków Ghetto was a closed ghetto meaning that it was physically closed off from the surrounding area and access was restricted. Within other German-occupied areas, open ghettos and destruction ghettos existed. Movement in and out of the ghetto was restricted and Jews working outside of the ghetto had to have the proper documentation. Jews had to "...obtain the appropriate stamps for the Kennkarten [identification cards]..." from the Labor Office (Arbeitsamt).

The ghetto was populated by approximately 16,000 Jews when it was first formed. Before the ghetto was cordoned off, it was home to around 3,500 residents. The ghetto consisted of 320 buildings. To accommodate the density, apartments within the ghetto were divided on a 2m² per person basis or by a standard of three people to one window. The Jewish Council (Judenrat) was responsible for determining the new housing assignments. Within the Kraków ghetto, Yiddish was the official language, not Polish. On 1 December 1939, an order was announced mandating that all Jews within the General Government wear an armband identifying them as Jewish. The white armbands with the blue Star of David were still required once Jews were moved into the ghetto.

On 15 October 1941, the Third Decree of the General Governor's was enacted. This decree stated that Jews found outside "...their designated residential area will be punished with death." The punishment also applied to anyone found aiding Jews. The decree applied to all residents within the General Government.

On 28 November 1941, the area that encompassed the ghetto was reduced. The population of the Kraków Ghetto increased because Nazis required the Jewish residents of 29 nearby villages to move to the ghetto. The size of the ghetto was reduced again in June 1942. The reductions in the size of the ghetto were associated with the deportation of Jews, including deportations to the Bełżec extermination camp. When apartments that were no longer included in the ghetto were vacated, possessions were stolen and the units were reassigned. The Municipal Housing Office was responsible for these apartments.

In December 1942. the Kraków ghetto was divided into two parts: Ghetto "A" and Ghetto "B." Ghetto "A" was intended for people that were working and Ghetto "B" was for everyone else. This division was planned with future liquidations of the ghetto in mind.

== Ghetto history ==
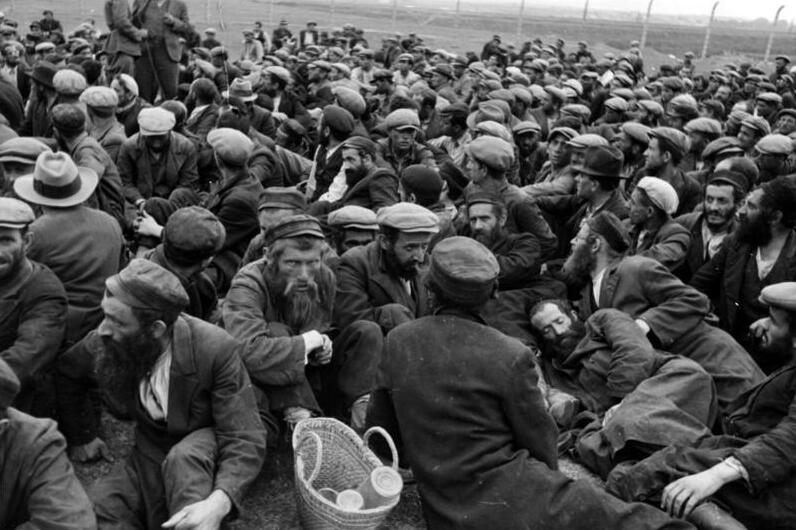
- Kraków area, late 1939. Captive Jews, assembled for slave labor, sit on an open field surrounded by new barbed wire fence

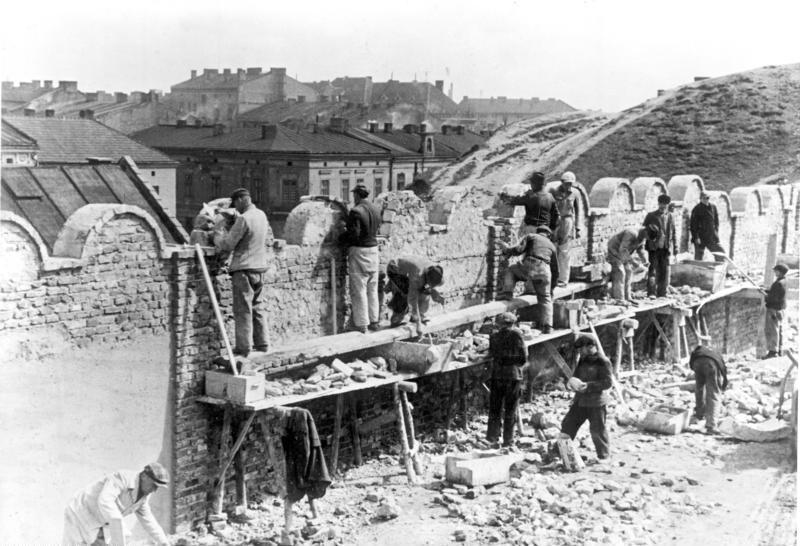
- Construction of the ghetto walls, May 1941

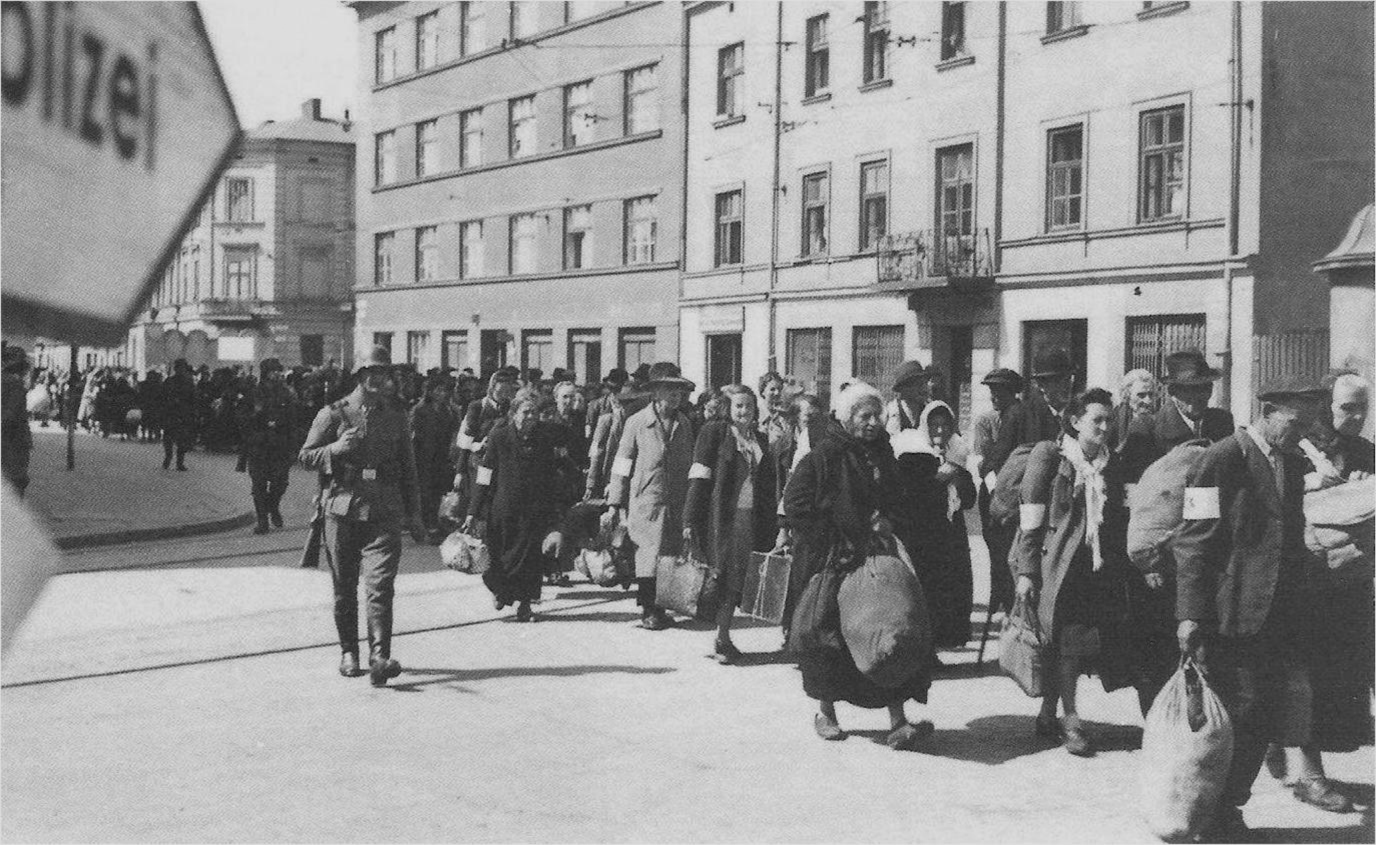
- Deportation of Jews from the ghetto, March 1943 (Salinarna Street, currently Lwowska Street)

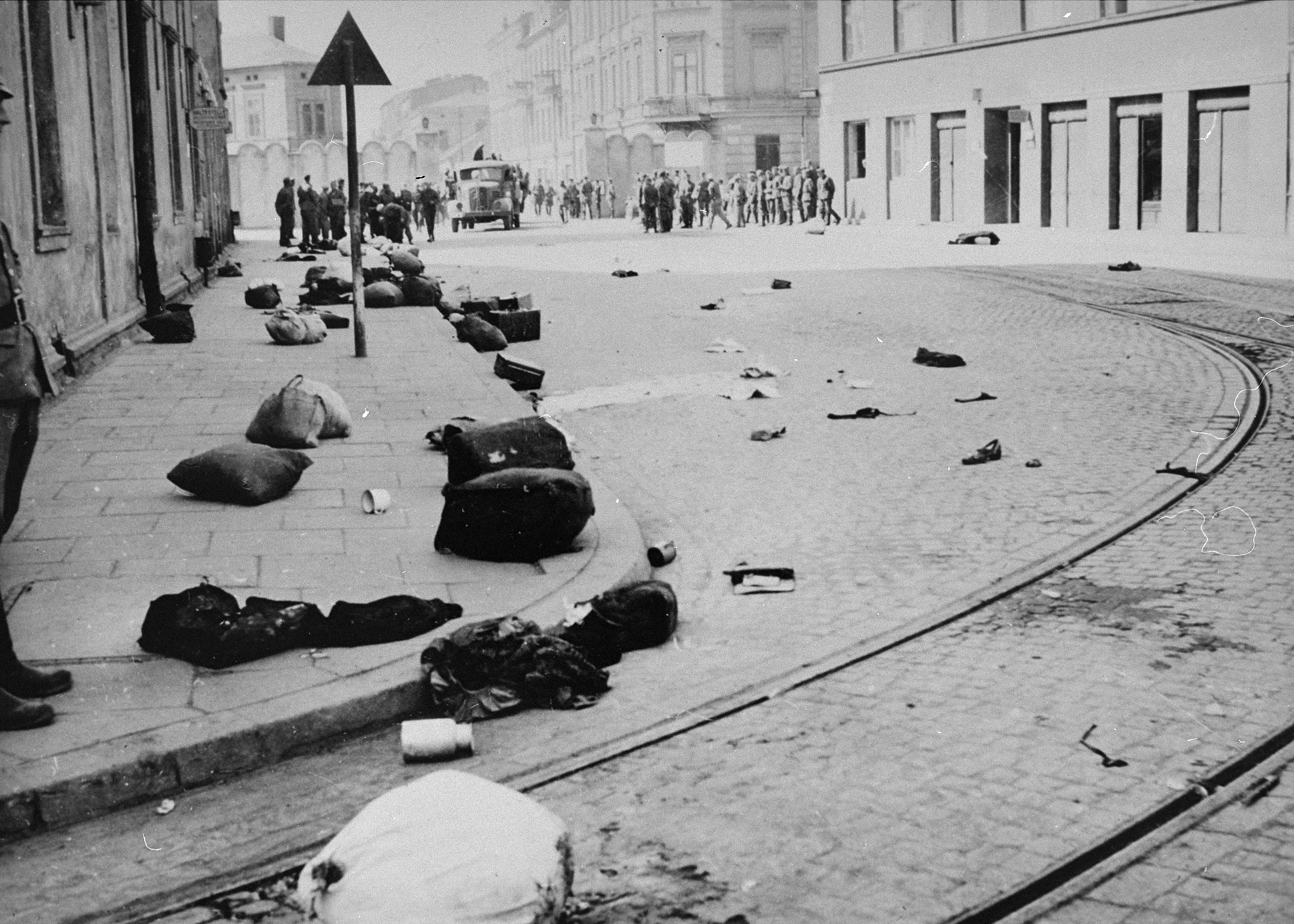
- Bundles abandoned by Jewish deportees from the Kraków Ghetto, March 1943

The Kraków Ghetto was formally established on 3 March 1941 in the Podgórze district and not, as often believed, in the historic Jewish district of Kazimierz. Displaced Polish families from Podgórze took up residences in the former Jewish dwellings outside the newly established ghetto. Meanwhile, 15,000 Jews were crammed into an area previously inhabited by 3,000 people who used to live in a district consisting of 30 streets, 320 residential buildings, and 3,167 rooms. As a result, one apartment was allocated to every four Jewish families, and many less fortunate lived on the street.

The ghetto was surrounded by the newly built walls that kept it separated from the rest of the city. In a grim foreshadowing of the near future, these walls contained brick panels in the shape of tombstones. All windows and doors that opened onto the "Aryan" side were ordered to be bricked up. Only four guarded entrances allowed traffic to pass in or out. Small sections of the wall still remain today, one part is fitted with a memorial plaque, which reads "Here they lived, suffered and perished at the hands of Hitler's executioners. From here they began their final journey to the death camps."

Young people of the Akiva youth movement, who had undertaken the publication of an underground newsletter, HeHaluc HaLohem ("The Fighting Pioneer"), joined forces with other Zionists to form a local branch of the Jewish Fighting Organization (ŻOB, Polish: Żydowska Organizacja Bojowa), and organize resistance in the ghetto, supported by the Polish underground Armia Krajowa. The group carried out a variety of resistance activities including the bombing of the Cyganeria cafe – a gathering place of Nazi officers. Unlike in Warsaw, their efforts did not lead to a general uprising before the ghetto was liquidated.

From 30 May 1942 onward, the Nazis began systematic deportations from the Ghetto to surrounding concentration camps. Thousands of Jews were transported in the succeeding months as part of the Aktion Krakau headed by SS-Oberführer Julian Scherner. Jews were assembled on Zgody Square first and then escorted to the railway station in Prokocim. The first transport consisted of 7,000 people, the second, of additional 4,000 Jews deported to Bełżec death camp on 5 June 1942. On 13–14 March 1943, the final 'liquidation' of the ghetto was carried out under the command of SS-Untersturmführer Amon Göth. Two thousand Jews deemed able to work were transported to the Płaszów labor camp. Those deemed unfit for work – some 2,000 Jews – were killed in the streets of the ghetto on those days with the use of "Trawniki men" police auxiliaries. The remaining 3,000 were sent to Auschwitz.

== Jewish Council (Judenrat) of the Kraków Ghetto ==
A 24-person Jewish board was formed in the city of Kraków and later in the Krakow Ghetto, when the ghetto was formed on March 3, 1941. This Jewish Council was in charge of the inhabitants of the ghetto but received many orders from local Nazi officials, even though it retained some degree of autonomy. Some of its functions included overseeing labor and welfare, conducting a census and taxing the population.

== Cultural life ==
Jews in the Kraków ghetto were required to wear a Star of David on their arm, identifying them as being Jewish, which led to the revoking of most rights. A curfew was implemented that stripped Jews of many opportunities to participate in the cultural life. As time went on, Jews needed to obtain permits in order to enter and exit the ghetto, robbing them of any freedom they felt they had left at this point. Even though the Jews were unable to participate in certain areas of cultural life in the Kraków ghetto, "various cultural and religious activities continued within the ghetto." Although the practice of religion was banned, that did not stop those in the Kraków ghetto from praying and staying true to Judaism. At least three synagogues or other religious facilities were still in use that served as a place for the Jews to go to and pray. There was also a café where artists played live music within the ghetto, which proved to be instrumental in keeping Jews' spirits up. Finally, there was a ghetto pharmacy, which was a place where people could go to discuss problems, read underground and official newspapers and learn the realities of what was happening and what atrocities they were living through. Numerous songs were created by those living in the ghetto, serving three major purposes: "documentation of ghetto life, a diversion from reality, and the upholding of tradition." These songs portrayed their immense suffering coupled with their dedication and determination to survive. Some of the most popular lyrics are "Me hot zey in dr’erd, me vet zey iberlebn, me vet noch derlebn" ("To hell with them, we will survive them, we will yet survive"), conveying and sharing the feelings of the Jewish people through music. Laughter, which was a rarity in the Kraków ghetto, was another way numerous victims attempted to cope with their strong hatred for the enemy. Sometimes prisoners performed ghetto songs, while other times small groups performed them with various instruments. Street songs are a sub-genre of ghetto music with four dominant themes: hunger, corrupt administration, hope for freedom and a call for revolt. Music has always been a traditional and important aspect of both Jewish holidays and Jewish home life more generally. The prisoners in the Kraków Ghetto did their best to keep this tradition alive, especially during Passover and Yom Kippur. Although music brought some comfort to many, suicide rates were significantly higher among the musicians than other camp workers. Many of the musicians were forced to watch the murder of their families and friends due to the Nazi's insistence that the prisoner-musicians play music while the other prisoners were marched to the gas chambers.

Aleksander Kulisiewicz was an aspiring musician who did his best to "collect, compose, and perform songs" while living in the ghetto even though it was illegal to do so. Inmates in the Kraków ghetto worked 12-hour days that left them more exhausted than imaginable. In order to pass the time, songs were sung throughout the work day.

Mordechai Gebirtig, who is "known for his beautiful and prescient songs and poems" in Yiddish emerged from the Kraków ghetto. His song "Our Town Is Burning" which was written in 1938 became "one of the most popular songs in the ghettos and concentration camps." Unfortunately, Gebirtig was shot and killed in the Kraków ghetto.

Another individual who was in the Kraków ghetto was Roman Polanski, who became a famous film director upon his survival of the Holocaust. Polanski eventually directed a film that told the story of the musician Władysław Szpilman who survived the Holocaust.

In order to pass time while trapped in these horrendous conditions, a lot of Jewish children in the Kraków ghetto played the violin and any other instruments they had access to.

Music proved to be an instrumental aspect of cultural life in the Kraków ghetto that aided in keeping the spirits of Jews up as much as possible during such low and awful times.

== Resistance ==
=== Organized resistance ===
The Kraków Jewish underground resistance existed from 1942 to late 1943, and stemmed from youth groups such as Akiva. The two groups that formed were Iskra and Hahalutz Halochem, or the Fighting Organization of the Jewish youth. Despite ultimately focusing on more classical armed resistance actions, they originally focused on providing support for education and welfare organizations within the ghetto. Eventually establishing a magazine, the groups initially focused on working with the Polish Underground and the Communist Partia Robotnicza (PPR). They ultimately planned for action against the Nazis. The Resistance conducted demonstrations against several Nazi-frequented institutions, including café Cyganeria, café Esplanada, and a theater. Additionally, the Polish Underground group also aided the Jews with a program called Żegota.

Initially, rather than aligning with either communist or Zionist groups, the Iskra Resistance group aimed solely at combating and destroying the Nazis. From the outset, Iskra's inaugural members were Heszek Bauminger, Shlomo Sh., and eventually Gola Mire. Heszek Bauminger fought for the Polish army at the beginning of the war, and despite participating in the Social Zionist Hashomer Hatzair group, he moved his allegiances to communism. Gola Mire – another Hatzair former member – became involved in the Polish Communist Party. Accordingly, Iskra worked in conjunction with the communist Polish Workers' Party division – Gwardia Ludowa – in an armed initiative. Specifically, German armed forces were the target of Iskra. Further, Resistance in the Kraków ghetto decided to attack the "Aryan" portion of the city rather than fight a futile war from within. To strengthen itself, Iskra merged with Hahalutz Halochem – thus mixing communist leanings with a Zionist group and subsequently forming the Jewish fighting Organization (Zydowska Organizacja Bojowa; ZOB) Despite the similarity in name this ZOB was independent from the ZOB involved in Warsaw Ghetto Uprising.

Historians will argue that the youth movements involved had significant, but realistic aims. It is suggested that Nazi intentions were evident to the youth and they consequently decided to fight the Nazis vision, even though they knew success would be limited. Significantly, composed of members of the Akiva Zionist youth movement, Hahalutz Halochem worked with Iskra along with communist to stage the Cyganeria bombing. Aligning with Hahalutz Halochem motivated Akiva to transition to armed resistance.

Furthermore, the underground movements published a paper called "Hechalutz Halochem" which was edited by Simon Dranger. This paper served to combat the German work of "Zydowska Gazeta"; this was an underground work which attempted to conceal the Nazis' genocidal aims and thus stem any opposition.

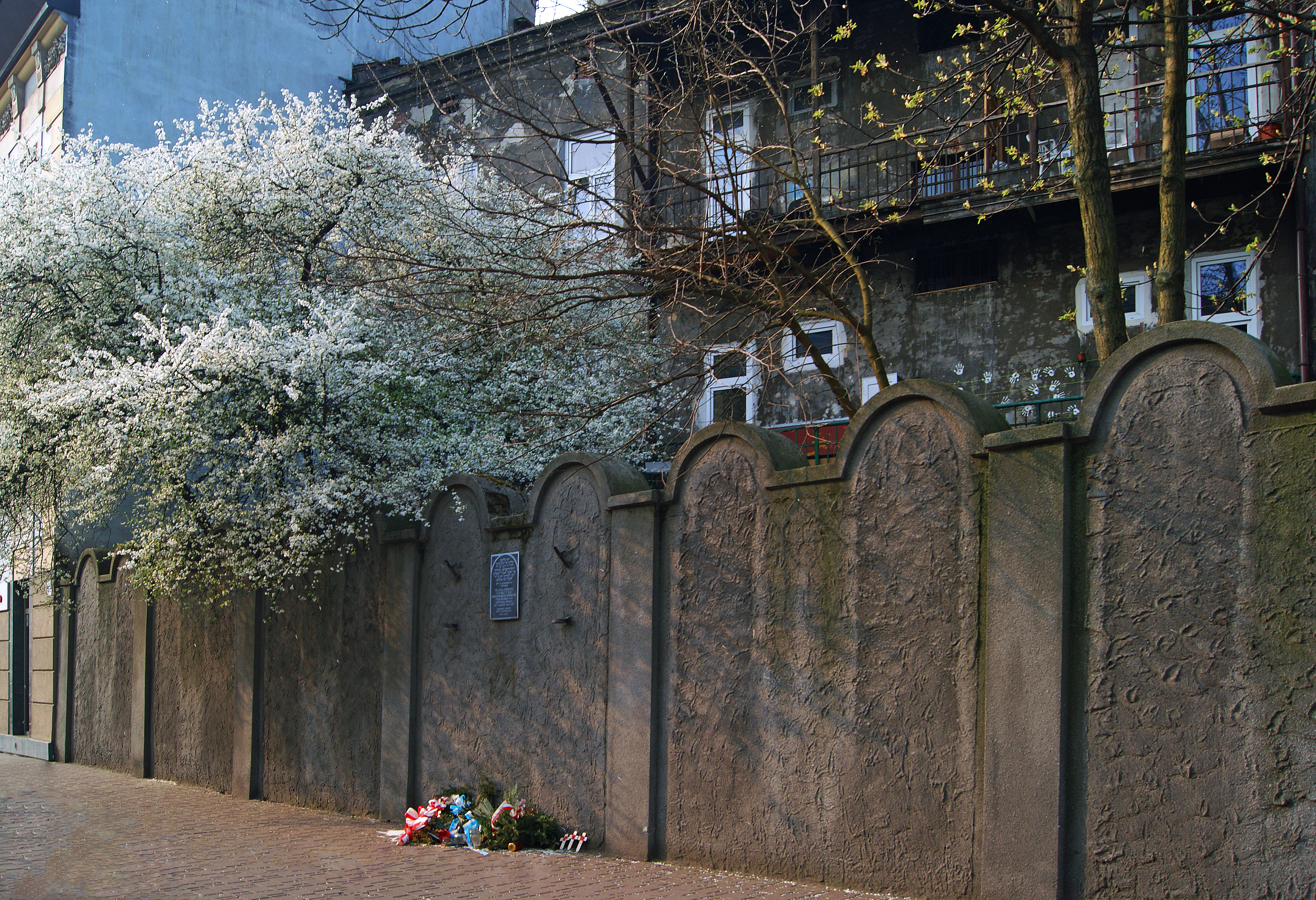
27 Lwowska Street
one of two preserved parts of the ghetto wall

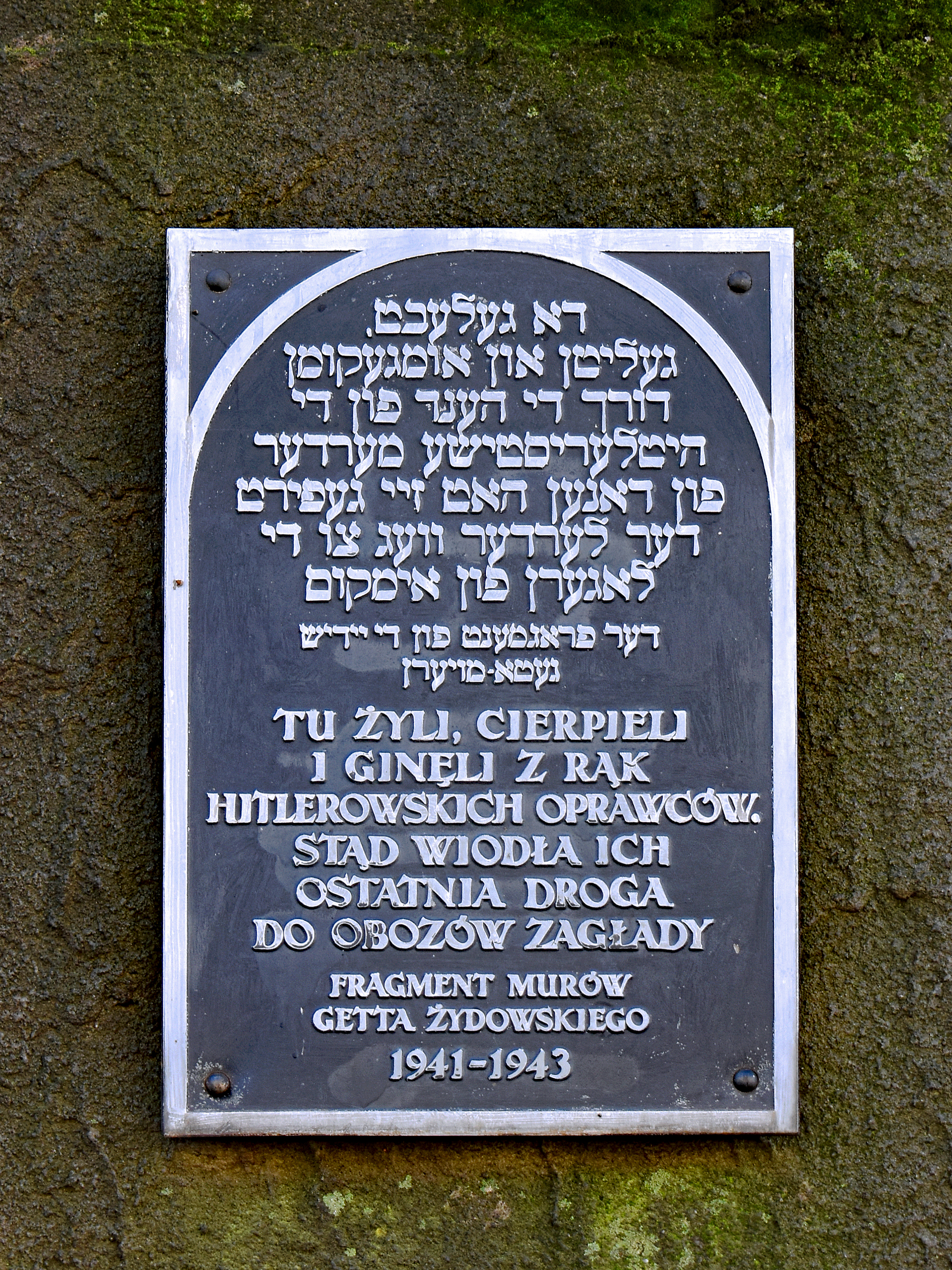
Ghetto wall 27 Lwowska Street Commemorative plaque

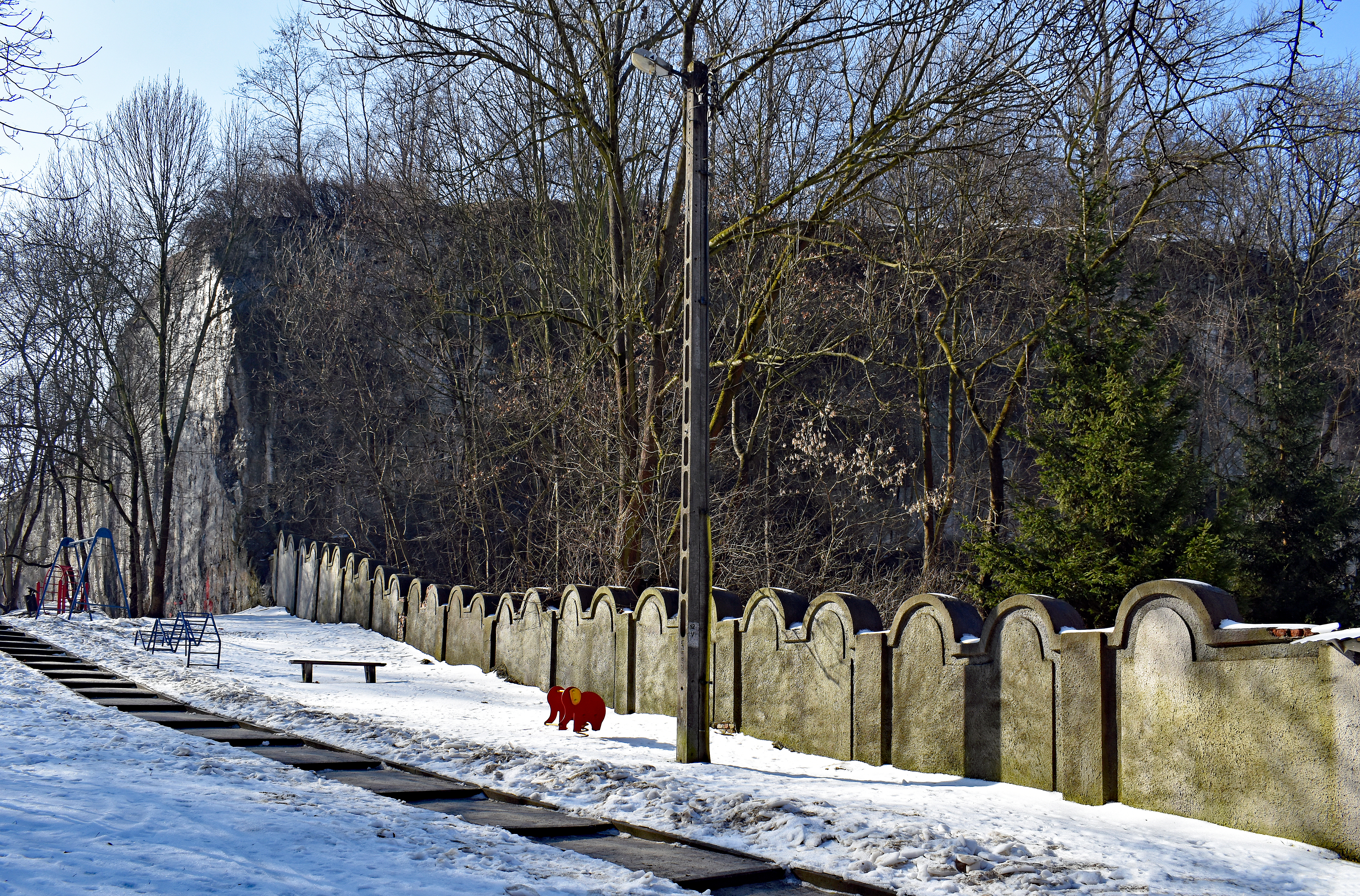
62 Limanowskiego Street
the second preserved piece of the ghetto wall

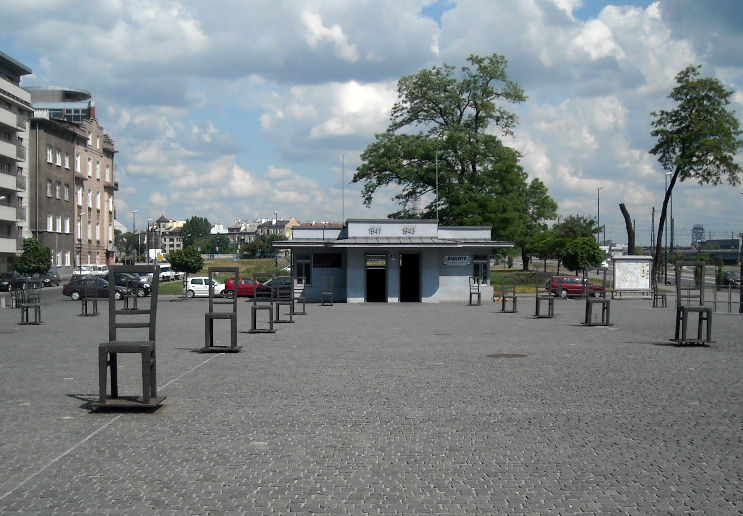
Bohaterów Getta Square
Memorial to Jews from the Kraków Ghetto on their deportation site. Each steel chair represents 1,000 victims

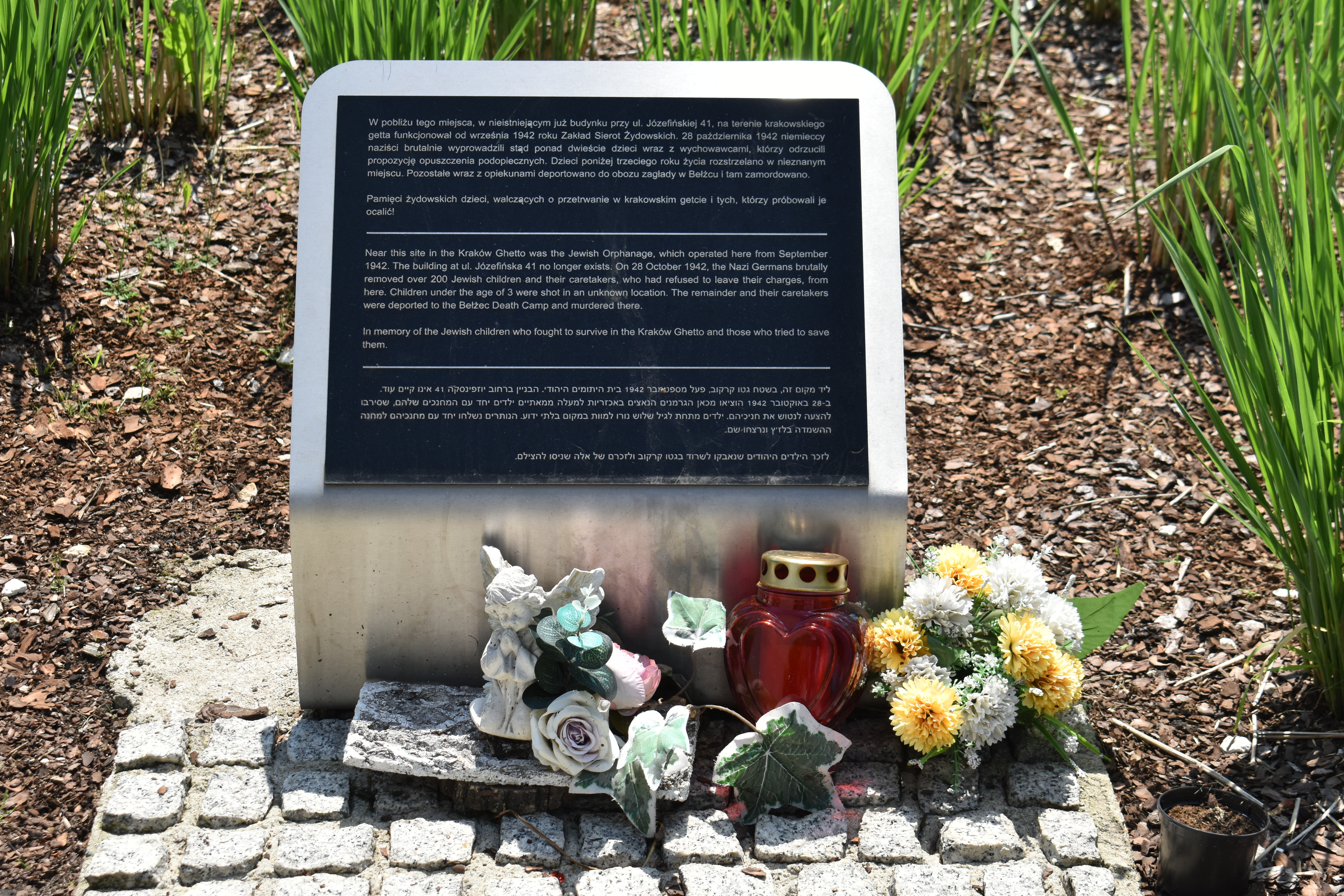
Memorial to over 200 Jewish orphans and their caretakers murdered by the Germans on October 28, 1942
41 Józefińska Street

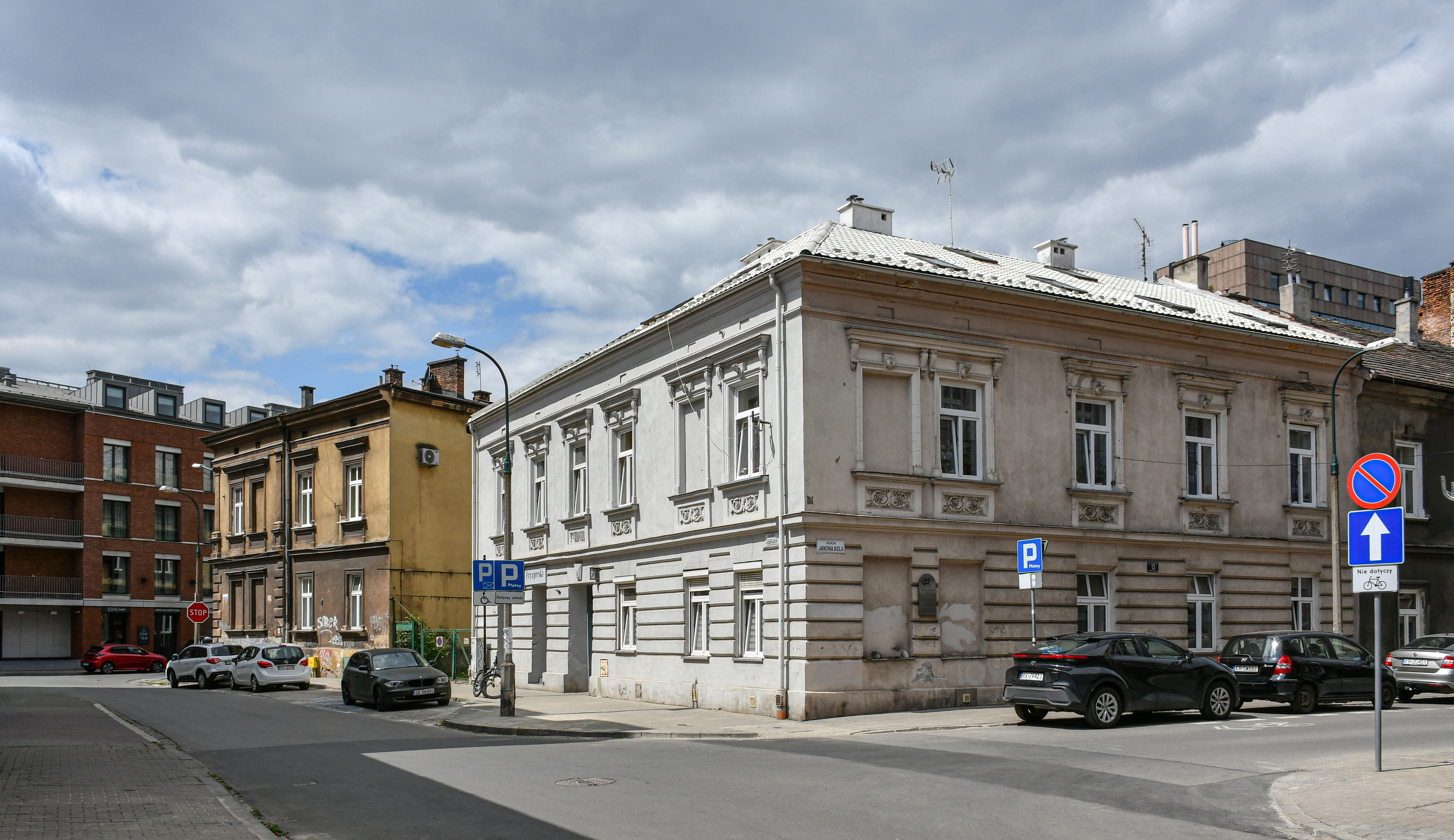
The Ghetto Memory Trail, the intersection of Dąbrówki and Janowa Wola streets. Here in 1942 the Germans murdered Abraham Neumann and Mordechai Gebirtig.

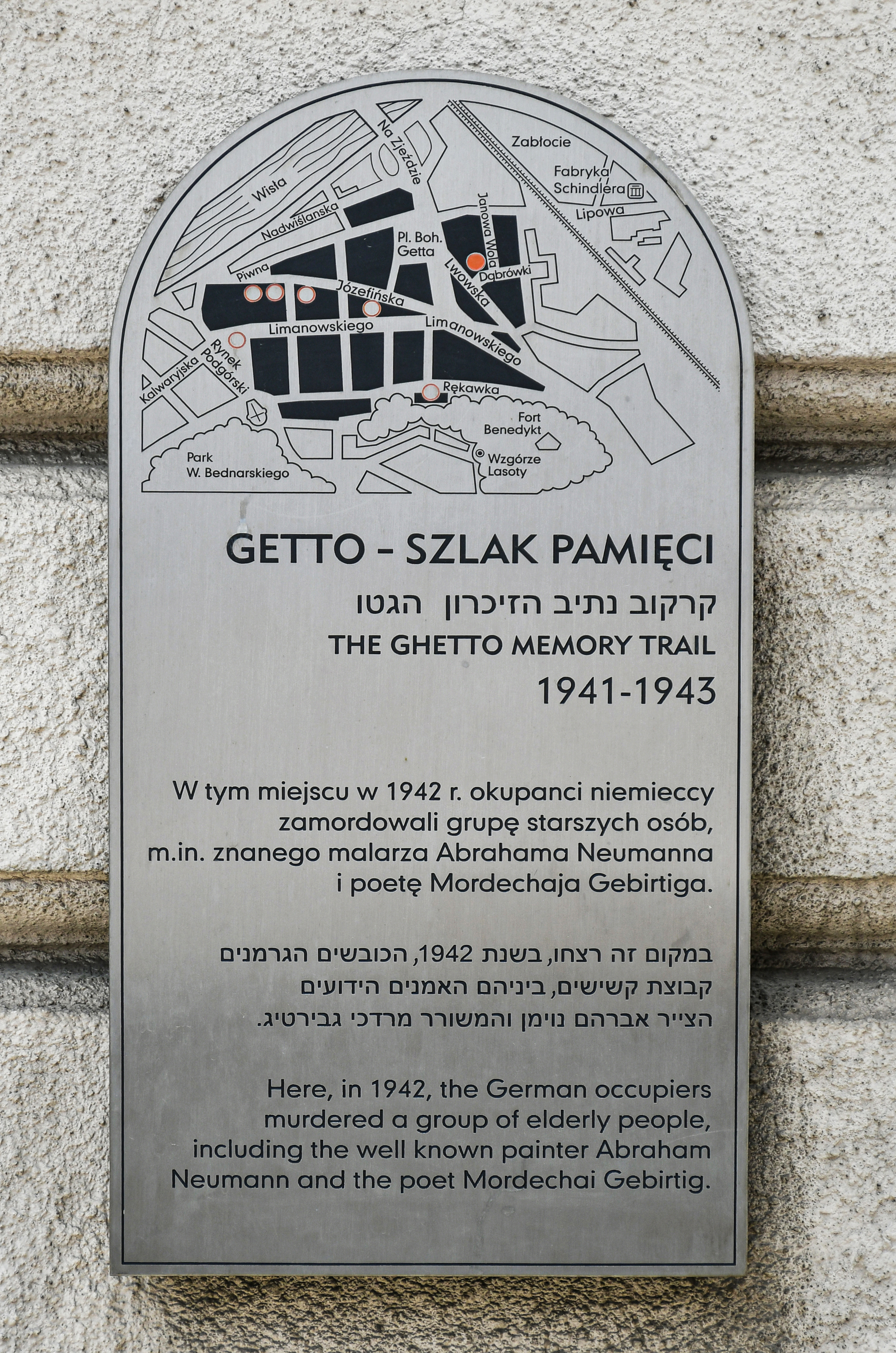
The Ghetto Memory Trail, 13 Janowa Wola Street, Commemorative plaque

=== Cyganeria Bombing ===
The Cyganeria Bombing is one of the more discussed attacks conducted by the Kraków Resistance movements. It was one of a series of attacks in a retaliatory response to the implementation of mass deportations. Prior to Cyganeria, attacks occurred at the Optima factory and the Cosmo Club – the Cosmo Club attack killed several Nazi elites. Furthermore, three attacks were planned for Dec. 24, 1942: Cyganeria Café, Esplanada Café, Sztuka theater, and an officers’ club. Ultimately, the Hahalutz Halochem and Iskra resistance groups bombed Cyganeria on December 22 and killed from 7 to 70 Germans and injured many others. The attack at the theater was relatively unsuccessful due to poor planning and a refusal to harm innocent Poles in attendance; however, Esplanada Café and the Officers’ club attacks were successful.

The relative success of the Resistance groups was hindered by Julek Appel and Natek Waisman who betrayed the resistance. Hahalutz Halochem was quickly subdued by the Nazis – due to Appel and Waisman – but better security habits protected Iskra for a limited time. Additionally, two key resistance members – Adolf Liebeskind and Tennenbaum – died in the attack. Finally, following the Cyganeria Café attack, weapons, various currencies, and enemy uniforms were found by the Gestapo. The Gestapo sent a message to Nazi elites via SS-Obergruppenfüher Wolff and Reichsfüher Himmler. Lucien Steinberg, the author of Jews Against Hitler, argues that this communicated the attack's significance to Hitler.

Publicly the identity of the attacks perpetrators were not revealed and it was rumored to be the Polish Underground or the Soviets. Regarding the Jews who carried out the attack, they were disguised as Poles. This reflected a concern, within Hahalutz Halochem, of Nazi retaliation against the ghetto if the Jews were implicated.

=== Religious resistance ===
Additionally, Jews in the Kraków Ghetto participated in a form of religious resistance by continuing to practice Judaism in secret. This succeeded through the safeguard of the Jewish police.

== Rescue and outside aid ==
=== The Righteous Gentiles ===
The only pharmacy enclosed within the Kraków Ghetto boundary belonged to the Polish Roman Catholic pharmacist Tadeusz Pankiewicz, permitted by the German authorities to operate his "Under the Eagle Pharmacy" there upon his request. The scarce medications and tranquillizers supplied to the ghetto's residents often free of charge – apart from health-care considerations – contributed to their survival. Pankiewicz passed around hair dyes to Jews compelled to cross the ghetto walls illegally. In recognition of his heroic deeds in helping countless Jews in the ghetto during the Holocaust, he was bestowed the title of the Righteous among the Nations by Yad Vashem on February 10, 1983. Pankiewicz is the author of a book describing, among other events, the ghetto liquidation.

The list of several dozen Polish Righteous from Kraków, includes Maria and Bronisław Florek who lived at Czyżówka Street and saved Goldberger and Nichtberger families. Notably, Maria Florek smuggled forged identity papers procured at the Emalia Factory of Oskar Schindler (without his awareness), for the Jews hiding on the 'Aryan side' of Kraków. Władysław Budyński, who provided help without remuneration even to complete strangers, ended up marrying a Jewish girl, Chana Landau in 1943, but they were caught by Gestapo in 1944 and deported to different concentration camps. Both survived, reunited in Kraków, and in 1969 emigrated to Sweden. Polish gynaecologist Dr Helena Szlapak turned her home at Garbarska Street into a safe house for trafficked Jews and distribution of falsified documents as well as secret messages and storage of photographs from Auschwitz. She collaborated with Żegota, attended to sick Jews in hiding and placed them in hospitals under false identities.

=== Żegota ===
Żegota also had prominence in Kraków. The goal of Żegota was to aid the Jews on a day-to-day basis – rather than aiming for an overall solution. Zegota provided opportunity with false documents, doctors for healthcare, money, and several other pivotal resources and aid for the Jews.

In Zegota, historians assert that Polish – Jewish relations were strong before the war, and Żegota became involved to strengthen the organically arising aid. Moreover, led by Stanislaw Dobrowolski, food, medicine, funds, and means for escape were provided. Several Żegota members – Jozefa Rysinska, Mieczyslaw Kurz, Tadeusz Bilewicz, Zygmunt Kuzma, and Ada Prochnicka – facilitated transport of supplies and overall aid in the camps.

== Notable people ==
Movie director Roman Polanski, a survivor of the ghetto, in his 1984 memoir Roman evoked his childhood experiences there before the mass deportations of Operation Reinhard in Kraków. "My own feeling – Polański wrote – was that if only one could explain to them that we had done nothing wrong, the Germans would realize that it all was a gigantic misunderstanding."

Many years later, Roma Ligocka, Polish artist and author, and a first cousin to Roman Polański who, as a small girl, was rescued and survived the ghetto, wrote a novel based on her experiences, The Girl in the Red Coat: A Memoir. She is mistakenly thought to be portrayed in the film Schindler's List. The scene, however, was constructed on the memories of Zelig Burkhut, survivor of Plaszow (and other work camps). When being interviewed by Spielberg before the making for the film, Burkhut told of a young girl wearing a pink coat, no older than four, who was shot by a Nazi officer right before his eyes. Oskar Schindler was portrayed in the Thomas Keneally novel Schindler's Ark (the basis for Steven Spielberg's film Schindler's List). In an especially dramatic event, 300 of Schindler's workers were deported to the Auschwitz death camp despite his efforts, and he personally intervened to return them to him.

Other notable people include Mordechai Gebirtig, who was one of the most influential and popular writers of Yiddish songs and poems. He was shot there in 1942. Miriam Akavia, an Israeli writer, survived the Kraków ghetto and concentration camps. Renowned dermatologist and co-discoverer of Reyes Syndrome, Dr Jim Jacob Baral was also a Kraków Ghetto survivor; his mother pushed him and his brother Martin under the barbed wire to hide at the home of a Polish rescuer who took them to Bochnia where their mother and sister joined them later. Bernard Offen, born in 1929 in Kraków survived the ghetto and several Nazi concentration camps.

Second lieutenant Jerzy Zakulski, an attorney, and member of the National Armed Forces (Narodowe Siły Zbrojne, NSZ) in German-occupied Kraków was sentenced to death by Stalinist officials and executed in Soviet-controlled postwar Poland on trumped-up charges of being an enemy spy. A Jewish Holocaust survivor from Kraków, Maria Błeszyńska née Bernstein, attempted to save Zakulski's life in gratitude for his rescue of her and her daughter during the Holocaust; however, she was unsuccessful. The certified letter she sent to the Regional Military Court in Warsaw was thrown out, along with the plea for presidential mercy.

Zuzanna Ginczanka and her husband left the Lvov ghetto for the Kraków ghetto in September 1942. She was arrested and shot in a prison in January 1945.

In 1940 Edward Mosberg, at the time 14 years old, and his immediate family, grandparents, cousins, and aunt were moved into one small apartment in the Kraków Ghetto. In 1942, his grandmother, aunts, and cousins were deported from it to Belzec concentration camp in German-occupied Poland. In 1943, the Kraków Ghetto was liquidated, and the remaining Mosberg family was moved to the Kraków-Płaszów concentration camp in Płaszów just south of Kraków, a Nazi concentration camp operated by the SS, which had been constructed on the grounds of two former Jewish cemeteries.

== See also ==
- History of the Jews in Poland
- The Holocaust in Poland
- Kraków Ghetto Jewish Police
- Kraków Ghetto Jewish Council
- List of Jewish ghettos in German-occupied Poland
- Arbeitsamt in occupied Poland

== Bibliography ==
- Graf, Malvina (1989). The Kraków Ghetto and the Plaszów Camp Remembered. Tallahassee: The Florida State University Press. ISBN 0813009057
- Polanski, Roman. (1984). Roman. New York: William Morrow and Company. ISBN 0688026214
- Katz, Alfred. (1970). Poland's Ghettos at War. New York: Twayne Publishers. ISBN 0829001956
- Schindler's List – reproduction of the original list of Jewish people employed by Oskar Schindler
- Schindler's Krakow – modern-day photographs
- (in Polish) * Praca zbiorowa Encyklopedia Krakowa, wydawca Biblioteka Kraków i Muzeum Krakowa, Kraków 2023, ISBN 978-83-66253-46-9 volume I page 408 (Encyclopedia of Krakow)
