= Julian Scherner =

SS officer (1895–1945)

- Julian Scherner (centre), with Karl Hermann Frank (left)
- Born: 23 September 1895; Bagamoyo, German East Africa
- Died: 28 April 1945 (aged 49); Niepołomice, Poland
- Spouse: Rosita Scherner (m. 1924)
- Military career
- Allegiance: German Empire; Weimar Republic; Nazi Germany
- Branch: Imperial German Army; Waffen-SS
- Service years: 1912–1920 (Imperial German Army); 1933–1945 (SS)
- Rank: SS-Oberführer
- Commands: SS-Truppenübungsplatz Böhmen; SS and Police Leader of Kraków
- Conflicts: World War I World War II

Julian Scherner (23 September 1895 – 28 April 1945) was a Nazi Party official and a high-ranking member in the SS of Nazi Germany. During World War II, he served as the SS and Police Leader of Kraków, Germany-occupied Poland.

== Early life ==
Scherner was born on 23 September 1895, in the town of Bagamoyo in German East Africa, where he lived until the age of two. Scherner attended the cadet schools, Kadettenanstalt, Karlsruhe between 1 October 1905 and 1911 and Berlin-Lichterfield between 1911 and 1914. Scherner was enlisted in the infantrie rgt. 114 between 15 March 1912 and 10 August 1914. During this time, Scherner earned the rank of Fähnrich in April 1914 and received officer rank on 5 August 1914. In 1914, he joined the Reichsheer or Imperial army. Scherner served in World War 1 as a Zugführer, Kompanieführer, company commander and platoon leader. Scherner was injured by shell splinters and rifle fire in the ankle and head respectively and was hospitalized between 1914 and 1915. After Scherner was released from the hospital, in 1915, he returned to his military unit but was captured by the French in May 1915. Scherner was awarded the Iron Cross second class and the Wound Badge in black and subsequently discharged from the military on 30 March 1920, with the rank of Oberleutnant.

After retiring from the military in 1920, he joined the Freikorps Oberland. Following the war, Scherner worked as a bank clerk from 1920 until 1924, then as a shop assistant until 1930 and after that as a partner in a merchant’s business until 1934.

Scherner married Rosita S (born 1 May 1899) on 1 May 1924. Scherner and his wife had two children. In 1923, Scherner took part in the Hitler-Ludendorff Putsch and was ultimately injured and arrested following the failure and ensuing chaos.

== SS career ==
Scherner joined the SS on 28 December 1932, and became a salaried SS officer in June 1934. Scherner commanded the SS training camp at Dachau between October 1937 and March 1940. Scherner eventually relocated to the SS Officer School at Bad Tölz. From September 1939 to 11 November 1939 he was regimental commander of the SS-Gebirgsjäger-Regiment 11 "Reinhard Heydrich". From summer to the winter of 1940, he was commander of the 8 Totenkopf-Standarte. As an SS garrison commander of Prague, between January and September 1941, Scherner supervised preparations for the establishment of a Waffen-SS training camp at Benešov, Bohemia. On 4 August 1941, Scherner was appointed SS and Police Leader in German-occupied Kraków.

=== Early corruption ===
Scherner was a close acquaintance of Oberscharführer Heinz Klare, meeting with him on numerous occasions. Scherner aided Klare in receiving extended work leave and enabled Klare's entry into the Waffen-SS while also guaranteeing Klare sick leave for a heart problem. Klare joined Scherner’s staff as ordnance officer and on 15 December 1941, became Scherner's personal adjutant. Scherner borrowed money numerous times from Klare personally and from Klare’s expense account, in violation of standing orders, over the course of 1941–1942. Klare and Scherner were condemned for living indecently and for possession of illegal food and spirits. The following investigation resulted in Klare’s arrest for possible involvement in black market dealings. Klare alleged that Scherner owed him money and had embezzled food stuffs and inappropriately used his service vehicle. The investigation yielded little punishment for Scherner. However, Scherner was reprimanded by the Reichsführer, Himmler, for his luxurious lifestyle. Himmler gave Scherner a serious warning and then tasked the court with investigating Scherner’s dealings. SS-Obergruppenführer Fredrich- Wilhelm Krüger, an acquaintance of Scherner's since childhood, asserted confidence in Scherner saying "[Scherner] is very companionable and helpful towards everyone. He gets close very quickly to every person, but unfortunately does not possess the ability to recognise [sic] and comply with the prescribed boundaries that apply to him in his official position towards subordinates." The judge decided Scherner had inappropriately abused his resources as well as helped Klare avoid the draft. The judge further concluded that Scherner had not been a party to military corruption and did not find Scherner's actions worthy of a court punishment. Scherner was sentenced to 14 days of, Stubenarrest, house arrest but this punishment was postponed until after the war and ultimately never imposed.

=== Destruction of the Krakow ghetto ===
Scherner along with Richard Wendler, were supportive of the murder and deporting of Jews as the "solution to the Jewish question". On 28–29 May 1942, Scherner began deportations from Krakow. Police battalions, commanded by Scherner, encircled the ghetto and announced all Jews were to required to register and would be killed if they did not comply. After the initial deportation, in May 1942, Scherner began an extensive murder campaign against the Jews within his jurisdiction. The murder operation moved through Tarnow, Rzeszow, Debica, Przemysl, Jaroslaw, Jaslo, Krosno, Nowy Sacz, Nowy Targ, Sanok and Miechow. Tarnow became the location for numerous mass shootings, the victims of which number approximately 10,000. In June 1942, 6,000 Jews from the Tarnow ghetto including men, women, children and hundreds of orphan children were murdered.

Although, the exact date is unclear, the official agreement to build the Płaszów concentration camp was likely in the autumn of 1942. Scherner gave orders regarding the construction of Płaszów, appointed the camp officers, was responsible for important camp matters and personally visited the camp. In November 1942, Scherner ordered all employed Jews to be congregated into forced labor camps. In 1943, Scherner gave orders to further isolate the working Jews. This was done as a preventative measure after Jewish rebellions.

=== Probation and Fate ===
Scherner was responsible for the deportations to the Bełżec extermination camp, the mass shootings in Tarnów and all 'evacuations' that took place during his time there – including Aktion Krakau. He liquidated Kraków Ghetto by deporting its inhabitants to Auschwitz.

His position afforded him a great deal of authority in many areas, as the title of SS and Police Leader was conferred to high-ranking Nazi Party members, reporting directly to Himmler's deputy. Like Amon Göth, Scherner was far too interested in the confiscated goods from the Płaszów camp. Scherner was transferred to Dachau in April 1944 and appeared before an SS Court (the dreaded Hauptamt SS-Gericht) on 16 October 1944. As a result, Scherner was demoted from SS-Oberführer der Reserve (Senior Colonel or Brigadier) in the Waffen-SS (1937–1944) to SS-Hauptsturmführer der Reserve (Captain) and transferred to the SS-Sonderregiment Dirlewanger under SS-Oberführer Dr. Oskar Dirlewanger as an adjutant (IIa). He later served as the adjutant for the SS-Sturmbrigade Dirlewanger.

He was found dead shortly before the war ended in a wooded area near Heidesee between Märkisch Buchholz and Halbe.

Military offices
Preceded by SS-Standartenführer Johann Maier	Commander of 1. SS-Standarte Julius Schreck; 1 January 1934 – 9 January 1935	Succeeded by SS-Sturmbannführer Hans Butchner
Preceded by SS-Standartenführer Heinrich Jürs	Commander of SS-Abschnitt XIV; 1 January 1937 – 1 October 1937	Succeeded by SS-Oberführer Kurt Ludwig
Preceded by none	Commander of SS-Gebirgsjäger-Regiment 11 Reinhard Heydrich; September 1939 – 11 November 1939	Succeeded by SS-Oberführer Bernhard Voss
Preceded by SS-Oberführer Wilhelm Claasen	Commander of SS-Totenkopf-Standarte 8 January 1940 – 10 January 1941	Succeeded by SS-Obersturmbannführer Heimo Hiertes
Preceded by none	Commander of SS-Truppenübungsplatz Böhmen; 20 January 1941 – 4 August 1941	Succeeded by SS-Oberführer Bernhard Voss
Preceded by SS-Oberführer Hans Schwedler	SS und Polizeiführer Kraków; 4 August 1941 – 4 March 1944	Succeeded by SS-Brigadeführer Theobald Thier
