= Isaiah Trunk =

Polish-American Jewish archivist and Holocaust historian

- Cover of Judenrat: The Jewish Councils in Eastern Europe Under Nazi Occupation by Isaiah Trunk
- Born: 1905; Kutno
- Died: 1981 (aged 75–76)
- Occupations: Historian, author
- Writing career
- Notable works: Judenrat: The Jewish Councils in Eastern Europe Under Nazi Occupation; Jewish responses to Nazi persecution : collective and individual behavior »in extremis«

Isaiah Trunk (Polish: Izajasz Trunk; 1905–1981) was a chief archivist of the Yiddish Scientific Institute YIVO in New York from Warsaw, and the leading historian on the Holocaust. Trunk was an expert on Jewish history during the Nazi occupation of Poland. A scholar and author originally from Poland, he was the winner of a National Book Award in history and a National Jewish Book Award in the Holocaust category for his monograph titled Judenrat: The Jewish Councils in Eastern Europe Under Nazi Occupation published in New York by Macmillan in 1972.

== Life ==
Born in Kutno in Congress Poland, Trunk graduated from the Hebraic Humanistic Gymnasium in Łódź in 1923, soon after the rebirth of Poland following World War I. Four years later he received a Master's degree in history from the Warsaw University. After his graduation, Trunk taught history in various city schools and was associated with the work of historians from YIVO in Warsaw.

During the Nazi German invasion of Poland in 1939, Trunk fled to Białystok in the Soviet occupied eastern Poland and then further east following the Soviet withdrawal during Operation Barbarossa. He returned to his homeland after the war. In 1950, during the darkest years of Stalinism in Poland, Trunk first made aliyah to Israel where he lived for three years and then moved to Canada where he obtained the position of director at the Peretz School in Calgary. He moved to New York City a year later to work at YIVO, where he became a chief archivist in 1971. He died in New York at the age of 75.

Trunk was the author of numerous articles and studies on the Holocaust in English and Yiddish, including his nominal Jewish Response to Nazi Persecution published in 1979.

== Judenrat ==
Trunk's ground-breaking research into the wartime activities of the Jewish Ghetto Councils was described as follows in the Kirkus Reviews:

In an understated, matter-of-fact way Trunk documents the prevalent favoritism and corruption of many Council members -- he always reminds us that no blanket generalizations hold -- and shows how Council taxes, which in large part went to pay salaries, fell most heavily on the poorest ghetto inhabitants. Along with the well-known brutality and self-aggrandizement of ghetto police, the horrifying caricature of a competitive society within the whole ghetto is described.

== Selected books ==
- Łódź Ghetto : a history, United States Holocaust Memorial Museum (Indiana University Press 2006)
- Jewish responses to Nazi persecution : collective and individual behavior »in extremis«, Stein and Day 1979, New York
- Judenrat; the Jewish councils in Eastern Europe under Nazi occupation, Macmillan 1972
- Religious, educational and cultural problems in the Eastern European ghettos under German occupation, Yivo Annual 1969
- The Holocaust, Yivo Institute for Jewish Research
- Unit on armed resistance, American Association for Jewish Education, New York
