= Judenrat =

Jewish councils in Nazi-occupied territories

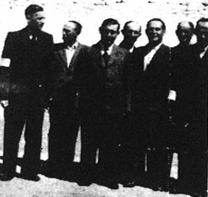
Judenrat in the town of Szydłowiec in occupied Poland, where the Jewish population was in the majority before the Holocaust

A Judenrat (Note: Plural: Judenräte.) (German: [ˈjuːdn̩ˌʁaːt], lit. 'Jewish council'; Yiddish: יודענראט) was an administrative body, established in any zone of German-occupied Europe during World War II, purporting to represent the Jewish community in dealings with the Nazi authorities. The Germans required Jews to form Judenräte within occupied territories at local and sometimes national levels.

Judenräte were particularly common in Jewish ghettos established by Nazi Germany in Eastern Europe, where in some cases, such as Łódź and Theresienstadt ghettos, they were known as the "Jewish Council of Elders" (Jüdischer Ältestenrat or Ältestenrat der Juden). Jewish communities themselves had established councils for self-government as early as the Middle Ages. The Jewish community used the Hebrew terms qahal (Hebrew: קהל) or qehilla (קהילה) but Nazi authorities used the German-language term Judenräte.

== Nazi considerations of Jewish legal status ==
The structure and missions of the Judenräte under the Nazi regime varied widely, often depending upon whether meant for a single ghetto, a city or a whole region. Jurisdiction over a whole country, as in Nazi Germany, was maintained by Reich Association of Jews in Germany (Reichsvereinigung der Juden in Deutschland) established on 4 July 1939.

In the beginning of April 1933, shortly after the National Socialist government took power, a report by a German governmental commission on fighting the Jews was presented. This report recommended the creation of a recognized 'Association of Jews in Germany' (Verband der Juden in Deutschland), to which all Jews in Germany would be forced to associate. Appointed by the Reichskanzler, a German People's Ward was then to assume responsibility of this group. As the leading Jewish organization, it was envisioned that this association would have a 25-member council called the Judenrat. However, the report was not officially acted upon.

The Israeli historian Dan Michman argued that the commission, which considered the legal status and interactions of Jews and non-Jews before Jewish emancipation, traced the term Judenräte back to the Middle Ages. This illuminates the apparent intent to make the Jewish emancipation and assimilation invalid, and so return Jews to the status they held during that era.

== Occupied territories ==
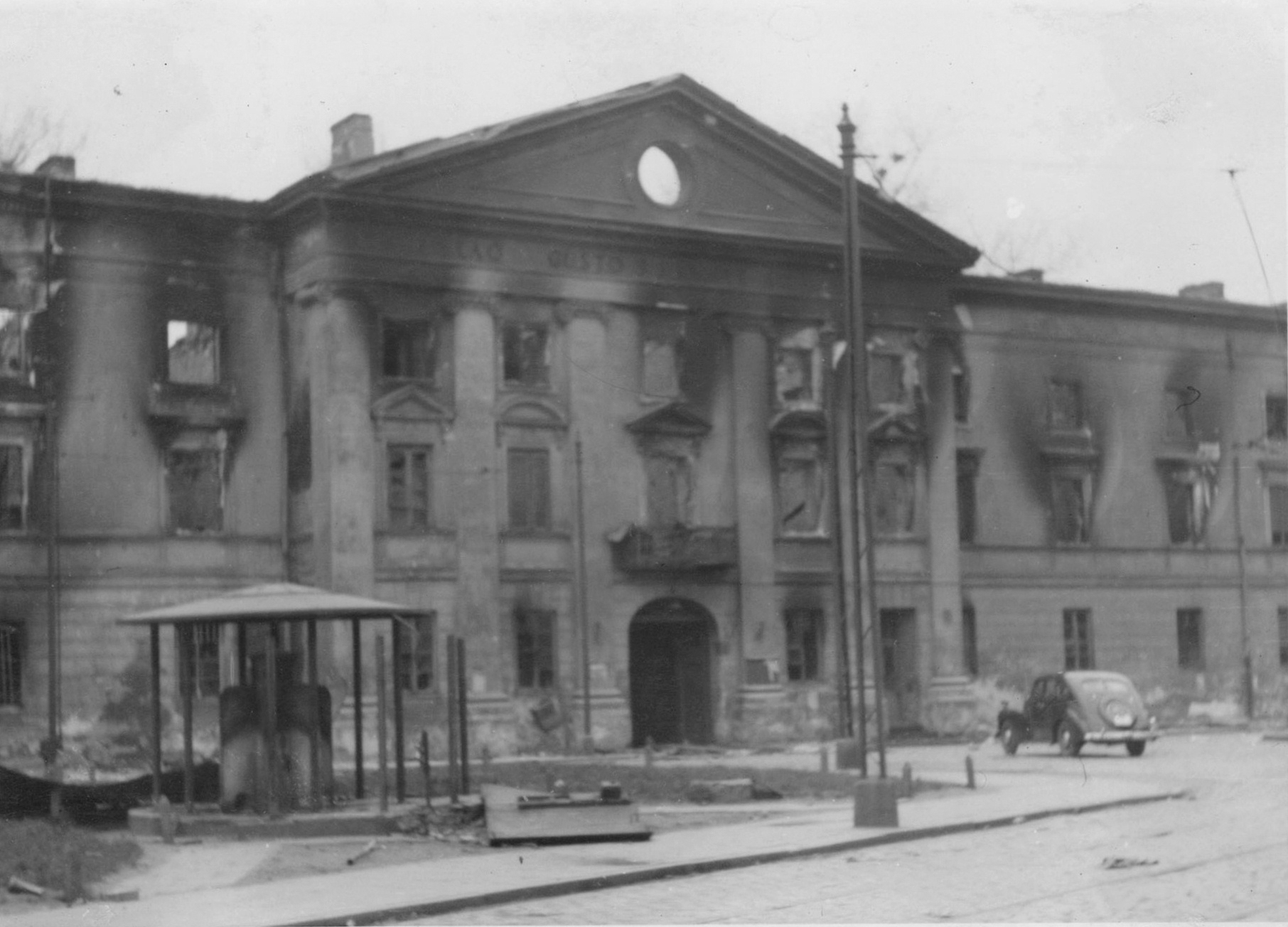
The building of the Jewish Council in Warsaw, burned during the Warsaw Ghetto Uprising

The first actual Judenräte were established in occupied Poland under Reinhard Heydrich's orders on 21 September 1939, during the invasion of Poland, and later in the occupied territories of the Soviet Union.

The Judenräte were to serve as a means to enforce the occupation force's anti-Jewish regulations and laws in the western and central areas of Poland, and had no authority of their own. Ideally, a local Judenrat was to include rabbis and other influential people of their local Jewish community. Thus, enforcement of laws could be better facilitated by the German authorities by using established Jewish authority figures and personages, while undermining external influences.

Further Judenräte were established on 18 November 1939, upon the orders of Hans Frank, head of the Generalgouvernment. These councils were to have 12 members for Jewish communities of 10,000 or fewer, and up to 24 members for larger Jewish communities. Jewish communities were to elect their own councils and, by the end of 1939, select an executive and an assistant executive as well. Results were to be presented to the German city or county controlling officer for recognition. While theoretically democratic, the councils were often controlled by the occupiers. While the German occupiers were minimally involved in the voting, those whom the Germans initially selected often refused to participate to avoid exploitation by the occupiers. As a rule, therefore, the traditional speaker of the community was named and elected, preserving the community continuity.

== Missions and duties ==
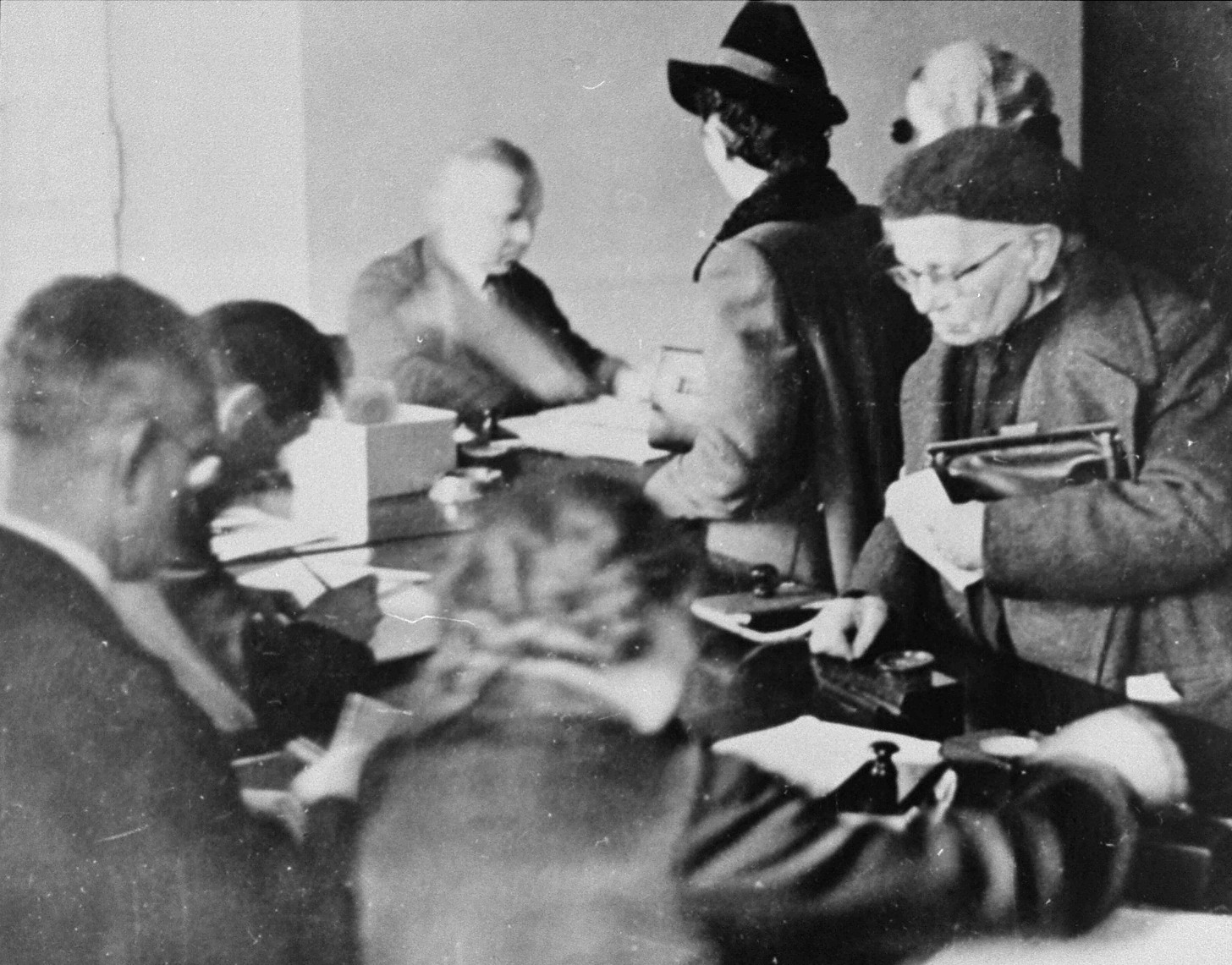
Applying for identification and work permits from Kraków Ghetto Jewish Council

The Nazis systematically sought to weaken the resistance potential and opportunities of the Jews of Central and Eastern Europe. The early Judenräte were foremost to report numbers of their Jewish populations, clear residences and turn them over, present workers for forced labour, confiscate valuables, and collect tribute and turn these over. Failure to comply would incur the risk of collective punishments or other measures. Later tasks of the Judenräte included turning over community members for deportation. Ultimately, these policies and the cooperation of Jewish authorities led to massive Jewish deaths with few German casualties because of the minimal resistance. Once under Nazi control and checked for weapons, large numbers of Jews could ultimately be easily murdered or enslaved.

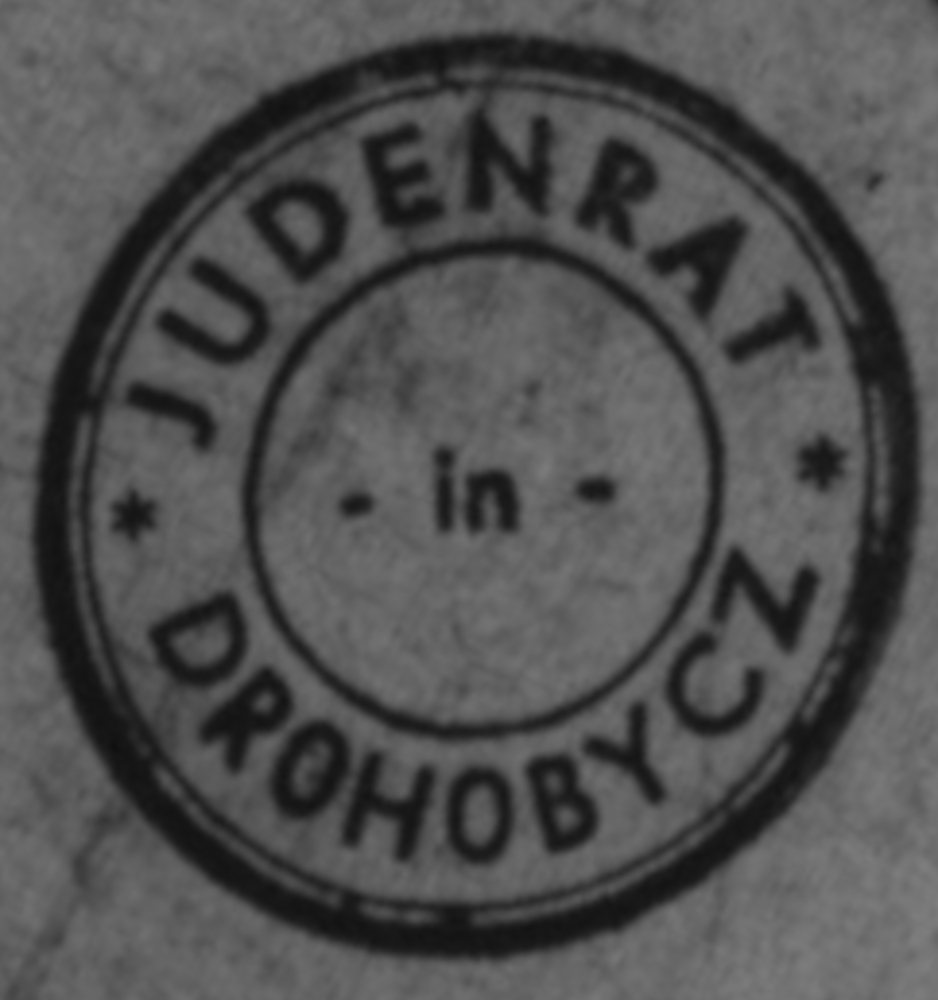
Stamp of the Judenrat of Drohobych, Ukraine: almost all of the 15,000 pre-war Jewish population were murdered.

Through these occupation measures, and the simultaneous prevention of government services, the Jewish communities suffered serious shortages. For this reason, early Judenräte attempted to establish replacement service institutions of their own. They tried to organize food distribution, aid stations, old age homes, orphanages and schools. At the same time, given their restricted circumstances and remaining options, they attempted to work against the occupier's forced measures and to win time. One way was to delay transfer and implementation of orders and to try playing conflicting demands of competing German interests against each other. They presented their efforts as indispensable for the Germans in managing the Jewish community, in order to improve the resources of the Jews and to move the Germans to repeal collective punishments.

This had, however, very limited positive results. The generally difficult situations presented often led to perceived unfair actions, such as personality preferences, sycophancy, and protectionism of a few over the rest of the community. Thus, the members of the community quickly became highly critical of, or even outright opposed their Judenrat.

Tadeusz Piotrowski cites Jewish survivor Baruch Milch stating "Judenrat became an instrument in the hand of the Gestapo for extermination of the Jews. ... I do not know of a single instance when the Judenrat would help some Jew in a disinterested manner," though Piotrowski cautions that "Milch's is a particular account of a particular place and time ... the behavior of Judenrat members was not uniform."

The question of whether participation in the Judenrat constituted collaboration with the Germans remains a controversial issue to this day. The view that Jewish councils collaborated in the Holocaust has been challenged by Holocaust historians including Isaiah Trunk in his 1972 book, Judenrat: The Jewish Councils in Eastern Europe Under Nazi Occupation. Summarizing Trunk's research, Holocaust scholar Michael Berenbaum writes: "In the final analysis, the Judenräte had no influence on the frightful outcome of the Holocaust; the Nazi extermination machine was alone responsible for the tragedy, and the Jews in the occupied territories, most especially Poland, were far too powerless to prevent it." This remains a topic of considerable scholarly disagreement.

This controversial point—i.e., her criticism of the alleged role of Jewish authorities in the Holocaust—is raised by Hannah Arendt in her book Eichmann in Jerusalem. In her writings, Arendt expressed her objections to the prosecution's refusal to address the cooperation of the leaders of the Judenräte with the Nazis. In the book, Arendt says that Jewish organizations and leaderships in Europe collaborated with the Nazis and were directly responsible for increasing the numbers of Jewish victims:

Wherever Jews lived, there were recognized Jewish leaders, and this leadership, almost without exception, cooperated in one way or another, for one reason or another, with the Nazis. The whole truth was that if the Jewish people had really been unorganized and leaderless, there would have been chaos and plenty of misery but the total number of victims would hardly have been between four and a half and six million people. According to Freudiger's calculations about half of them could have saved themselves if they had not followed the instructions of the Jewish Councils.

She adds that Pinchas Freudiger, a witness at the trial, had managed to survive the genocide because he was wealthy and able to buy the favors of the Nazi authorities, as did other leaders of Jewish Councils.

On several occasions, most notably in her interviews with Joachim Fest and Günter Gaus, Arendt refuted this characterization of her writing, describing instead ways in which the Judenräte were coerced and intimidated into their roles, and how the Nazis made examples of populations that resisted, saying in a response during an interview with Günter Gaus, "When people reproach me with accusing the Jewish people [of nonresistance], that is a malignant lie and propaganda and nothing else. The tone of voice, however, is an objection against me personally. And I cannot do anything about that."

== Ghettos ==
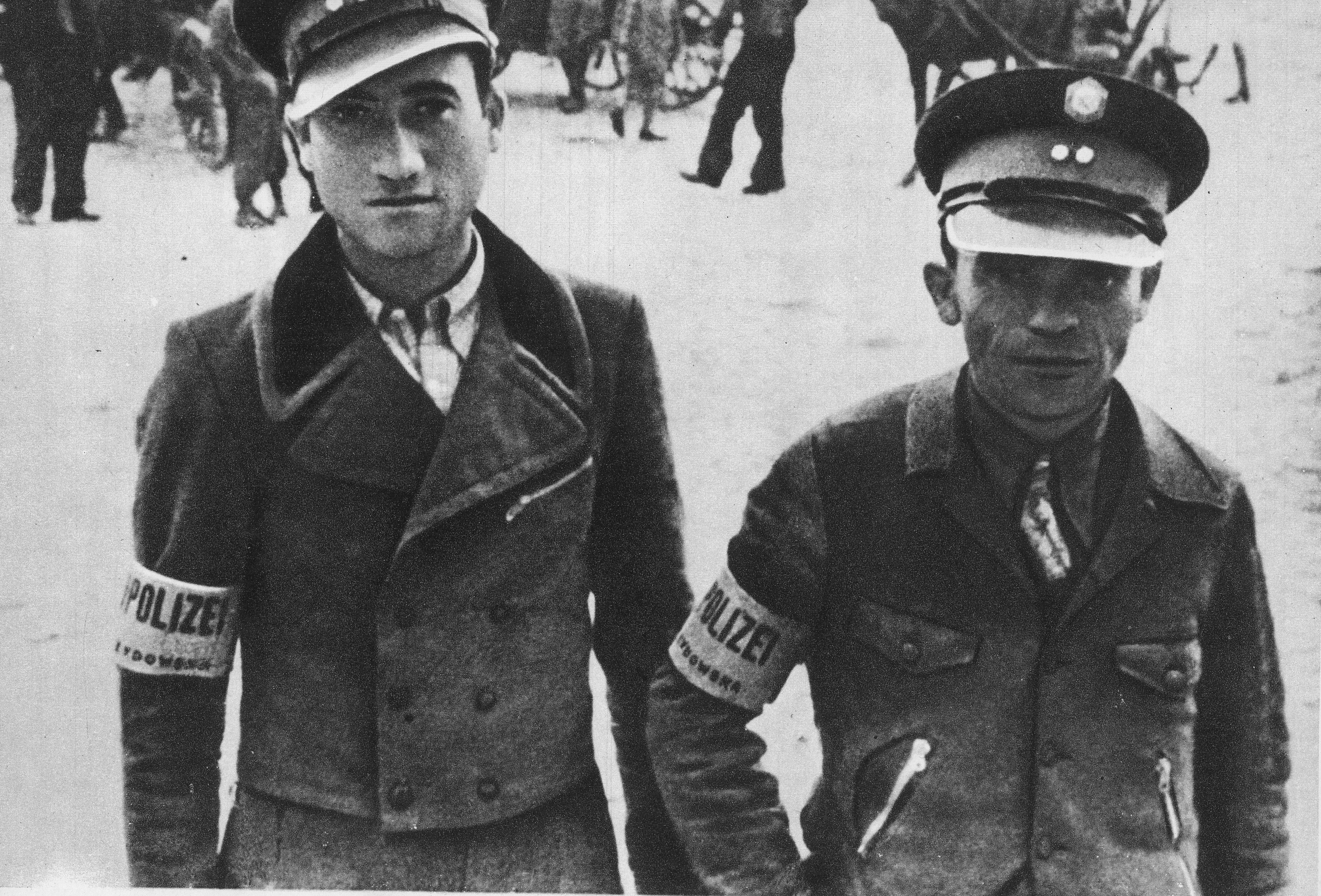
Jewish police in the Węgrów Ghetto, Poland

Judenräte were responsible for the internal administration of ghettos, standing between the Nazi occupiers and their Jewish communities. In general, the Judenräte represented the elite from their Jewish communities. Often, a Judenrat had a group for internal security and control, a Jewish Ghetto Police (German: Jüdische Ghetto-Polizei or Jüdischer Ordnungsdienst). They also attempted to manage the government services normally found in a city, such as those named above. However, the Germans requiring them to deliver community members for forced labor or deportation to concentration camps, placed them in the position of cooperating with the German occupiers. To resist such orders was to risk summary execution, or quick replacement and inclusion in the next concentration-camp shipment.

In a number of cases, such as the Minsk ghetto and the Łachwa ghetto, Judenräte cooperated with the resistance movement. In other cases, Judenräte cooperated with the Germans (although, as discussed above, the extent of this collaboration remains debated).

== See also ==
- Bratislava Working Group, a resistance organisation formed by members of the Judenrat in Bratislava, Slovakia
- Adam Czerniaków, head of the Warsaw Ghetto Judenrat
- Ghetto uprisings
- Jewish councils in Hungary, existed in 1944–1945, during the German occupation of Hungary
- Dov Lopatyn, head of the Judenrat in Łachwa, German-occupied Poland
- Mordechai Chaim Rumkowski, head of the Council of Elders in the Łódź Ghetto
- Theresienstadt Ghetto, a fortress in Bohemia where a Nazi-appointed "cultural council" organized the life of the Jewish prisoners.

== Literature ==
- Arendt, Hannah (2006) [1963, Viking Press, revised 1968]. Eichmann in Jerusalem: A Report on the Banality of Evil. Penguin Publishing Group. ISBN 978-1-101-00716-7.
- Diner, Dan (1990). "Jenseits der Vorstellbaren - Der 'Judenrat' als Situation". In Loewy, Hanno; Schoenberner, Gerhard; Jüdisches Museum Frankfurt a.M. (eds.). Unser einziger Weg ist Arbeit: Das Ghetto in Lodz 1940–1944 (in German). Vienna: Löcker. ISBN 3-85409-169-9.
- Fuks, Marian (1987). "Das Problemm der Judenraete und Adam Czerniaks Anstaendigkeit". In Jersch-Wenzel, Stefi (ed.). Deutsche - Polen - Juden (in German). Berlin: Colloquium Verl. pp. 229–239. ISBN 3-7678-0694-0.
- Michman, Dan (2003). "Jewish 'Headships' under Nazi Rule: The Evolution and Implementation of an Administrative Concept". Holocaust historiography: a Jewish perspective: conceptualizations, terminology, approaches, and fundamental issues. London; Portland, OR: Vallentine Mitchell. pp. 159–175. ISBN 0-85303-436-2.
- Michman, Dan (2006). "On the Historical Interpretation of the Judenräte Issue: Between Intentionalism, Functionalism and the Integrationist Approach of the 1990s". In Zimmermann, Mosche (ed.). On Germans and Jews Under the Nazi Regime. Jerusalem: The Hebrew University Magnes Press. pp. 385–397. ISBN 978-965-493-254-7.
- Rabinovici, Doron (2000). Instanzen der Ohnmacht - Wien 1938–1945 - Der Weg zum Judenrat (in German). Frankfurt am Main: Jüdischer Verlag. ISBN 3-633-54162-4.
- Trunk, Isaiah (1977). Judenrat: The Jewish Councils in Eastern Europe under Nazi Occupation. New York: Stein & Day Pub. ISBN 0-8128-2170-X.
- Wahlen, Verena (1974). "Select Bibliography on Judenraete under Nazi Rule". Yad Vashem Studies. 10: 277–294.
- Weiss, Aharon (1977). "Jewish Leadership in Occupied Poland: Postures and Attitudes". Yad Vashem Studies. 12: 335–365.
