= Operation Reinhard in Kraków =

1942-43 German mass murder of Polish Jews in Kraków, Poland

Aktion Krakau
- Kraków Ghetto. German checkpoint during the anti-Jewish Operation Aktion Krakau in 1942
- Also known as: German: Einsatz Krakau
- Location: Occupied Kraków
- Date: June 1942 - March 1943
- Incident type: Mass deportations to extermination camps
- Perpetrators: Amon Göth, Julian Scherner, Odilo Globočnik and others
- Participants: Nazi Germany
- Organizations: Waffen-SS, Schutzstaffel, Order Police battalions, Sicherheitsdienst
- Camp: Belzec extermination camp Auschwitz-Birkenau; Kraków-Płaszów concentration camp
- Ghetto: Kraków Ghetto including other Jewish ghettos in German-occupied Poland
- Victims: Over 11,000
- Memorials: Ghetto site and deportation point
- Notes: The most lethal phase of the Holocaust.

Operation Reinhard in Kraków, often referred to by its original codename in German as Aktion Krakau, was a major 1942 German Nazi operation against the Jews of Kraków, Poland. It was headed by SS and Police Leader Julian Scherner from the Waffen-SS. The roundup was part of the countrywide Aktion Reinhard (Operation Reinhard), the mass murder of Polish Jews in the so-called General Government under the command of SS und Polizeiführer Odilo Globočnik.

== History ==
Beginning in 1941, all Jewish inhabitants of Kraków were ordered to relocate into Kraków Ghetto, the newly established ghetto situated in the Podgórze district, away from the predominantly Jewish district of Kazimierz. A German Labour Office (Arbeitsamt) was set up for those employed outside the Ghetto. At the beginning of 1942, the entire Jewish population of Greater Kraków (including 29 surrounding villages) was forced to move into the same Ghetto with each person granted 4 cubic meters (140 cu ft) of space. On 1 June 1942 the ghetto was surrounded by German police and SS. To conceal the purpose of the "Aktion" and calm the Jewish population, the SD and SiPo officers – among them SS-Obersturmbannführer Willi Haase, SS-Obersturmführer Becher, and SS-Hauptscharführer Heinrich – told the Jews of a "resettlement" program. Jews who worked in German factories were permitted to remain, while the first transport of 7,000 Jews was assembled on Zgody Square and escorted to the railway station in Prokocim. On 5 June 1942, an additional 4,000 Jews were deported to Bełżec extermination camp in a similar way.

On 13 March and 14 March 1943, the Nazis carried out the final 'liquidation' of the ghetto under the command of SS-Hauptsturmführer Amon Göth. Those deemed able to work were transported to the Płaszów concentration camp. Some 2,000 Jews unable to move or attempting to run were killed in the streets and in their homes. The captives were sent to Auschwitz. As noted by historians Ernst Klee, Willi Dressen and Volker Riess, the German police from the office of Grenz Polizeikommissariat were quite eager to take part in the murdering of Jews in and around Kraków, in anticipation of considerable material gains.

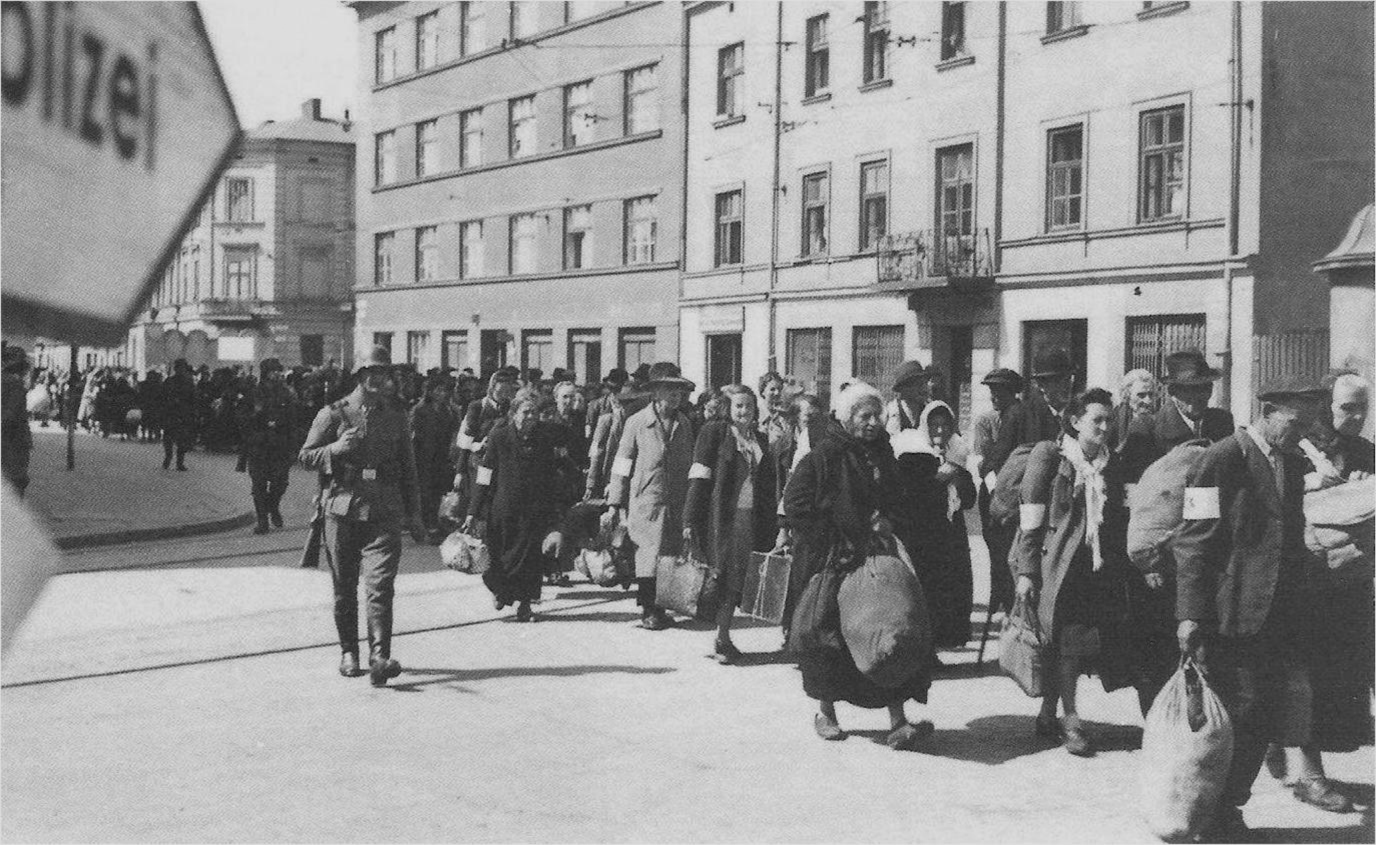
Deportation of Jews from the Kraków Ghetto, March 1943. The final ghetto 'liquidation' action

Members of the Grenzpolizeikommissariat were, with a few exceptions, quite happy to take part in shootings of Jews. They had a ball! Obviously they can't say that today! Nobody failed to turn up... I want to repeat that people today give a false impression when they say that the actions against the Jews were carried out unwillingly. There was great hatred against the Jews; it was revenge, and they wanted money and gold. Don't let's kid ourselves, there was always something up for grabs during the Jewish actions. Everywhere you went there was always something for the taking. The poor Jews were brought in, the rich Jews were fetched and their homes were scoured.

— a Kripo official from the Kraków district, "The Good Old Days": The Holocaust as Seen by Its Perpetrators

== Enamelware factory ==
The majority of Jews who survived the 1942–43 Ghetto liquidation programme in Kraków, came from the Deutsche Emaillewaren-Fabrik (DEF) owned by the Sudeten German industrialist and war profiteer Oskar Schindler. Tipped off to the factory closure, Schindler persuaded the SS officials to allow him to move his 1,200 Jewish workers from the Kraków Ghetto to the Brünnlitz labor camp in Brněnec, Czech Protectorate, thus sparing them from deportation to death camps.

Schindler's factory relocation is not to be confused with the similar evacuation of Przemyśl Jews from deportation to Bełżec. The liquidation of Przemyśl Ghetto took place on July 27, July 31 and August 3, 1942. The operation was directed by SS-Hauptsturmführer Martin Fellenz. On 27 July 1942, the military commander of Przemyśl, Max Liedtke, ordered his troops to seize the bridge across the San River that connected the divided city of Przemyśl, and halt the evacuation. The Gestapo was forced to give him permission to retain workers performing service for the Wehrmacht. For the actions undertaken by Liedtke and his adjutant Albert Battel in Przemyśl, Yad Vashem later named them "Righteous Among the Nations". After the Aktion had taken place, Jews in the Ghetto were requested to pay the transportation costs for the so-called 'evacuation'. All of them were deported to Bełżec extermination camp thereafter.

== See also ==
- Arbeitsamt in occupied Poland
- Gross Aktion in Warsaw Ghetto (beginning 22 July 1942) part of Reinhard Aktion against Polish Jews in General Government (German: Endlösung). More info at YadVashem (Treblinka)
- Sonderaktion Krakau
- German AB-Aktion operation in Poland
- The Holocaust in Poland
- Schindler's List, a 1993 film about Oskar Schindler
