= Shoes on the Danube Bank =

Memorial in Budapest, Hungary

Coordinates: 47°30′14.05″N 19°02′41.22″E

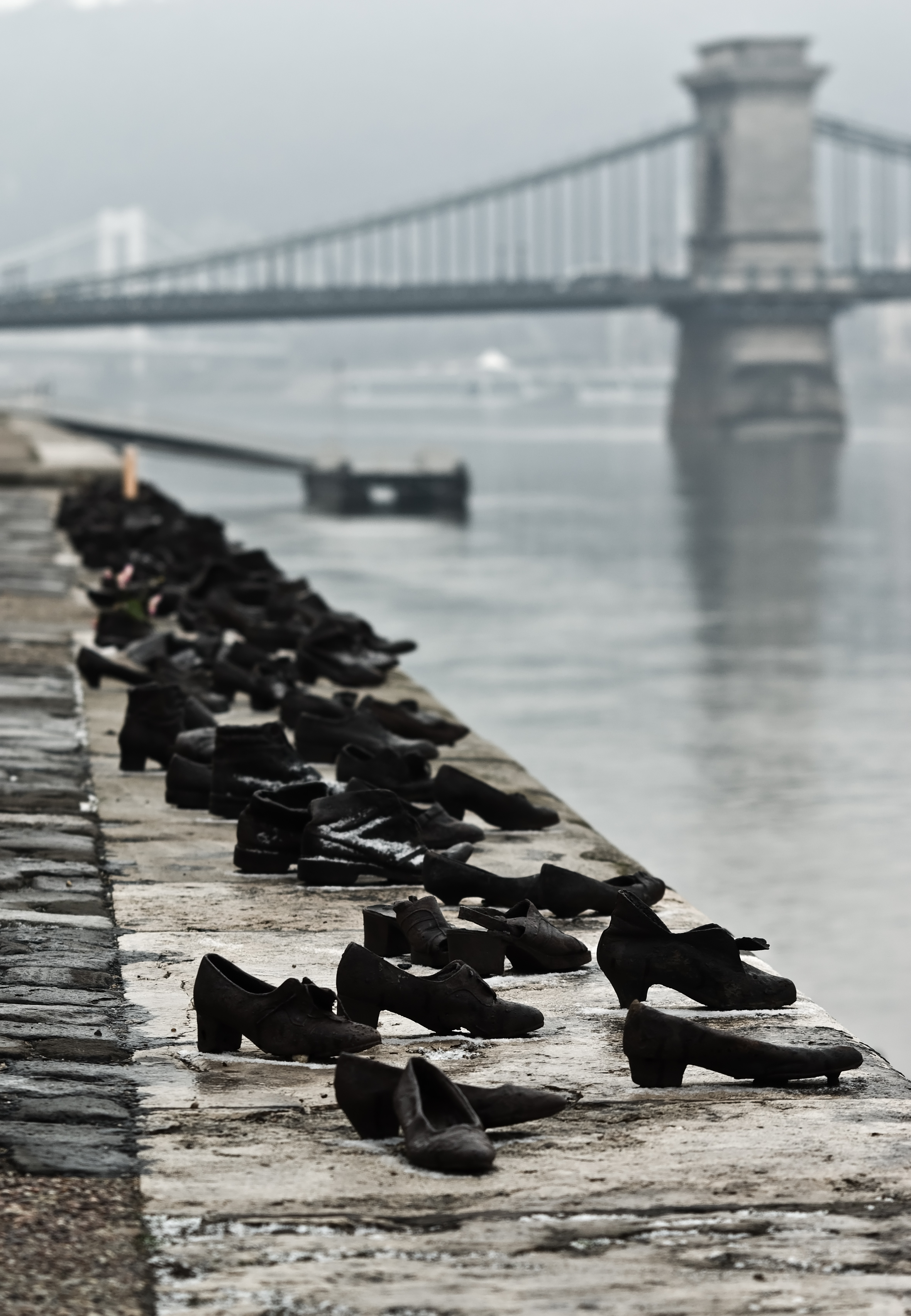
- Interactive map of Shoes on the Danube Bank
- Location: East bank of the Danube River, Budapest
- Completion date: 16 April 2005

The Shoes on the Danube Bank (Hungarian: Cipők a Duna-parton) is a memorial erected on 16 April 2005, in Budapest, Hungary. Conceived by film director Can Togay, he created it on the east bank of the Danube River with sculptor Gyula Pauer to honour thousands of people massacred by fascist Hungarian militia belonging to the Arrow Cross Party in Budapest during the Second World War. Victims were ordered to take off their shoes (shoes were valuable and could be stolen and resold by the military after the massacre), and were shot at the edge of the water so that their bodies fell into the river and were carried away. The memorial represents their shoes left behind on the bank.

== Memorial ==
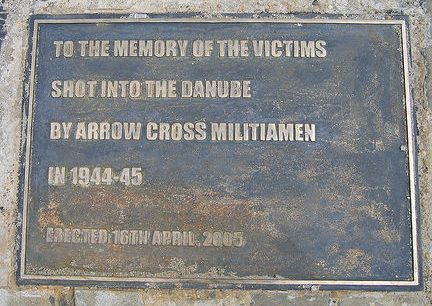
Commemorative plaque

The monument is located on the Pest side of the Danube Promenade in line with where Zoltan Street would meet the Danube if it continued that far, about 300 metres (1,000 ft) south of the Hungarian Parliament and near the Hungarian Academy of Sciences; between Roosevelt Square and Kossuth square.

The composition titled 'Shoes on the Danube Bank' gives remembrance to the 23,500 people, 20,000 of them Jews, who were shot into the Danube during the time of the Arrow Cross terror. The sculptor created sixty pairs of period-appropriate shoes out of iron. The shoes are attached to the stone embankment, and behind them lies a 40-meter-long, 70 cm high stone bench. At three points are cast iron signs, with the following text in Hungarian, English, and Hebrew: "To the memory of the victims shot into the Danube by Arrow Cross militiamen in 1944–1945. Erected 16 April 2005."

== History ==
Most of the murders along the edge of the River Danube took place around December 1944 and January 1945, when the members of the Hungarian Arrow Cross Party police ("Nyilas") took as many as 3,600 Jews from the newly established Budapest ghetto and executed them along the river bank. Tommy Dick describes one surviving person's story from these operations in his book Getting Out Alive and testimony. In February 1945, the Soviet forces liberated Budapest.

During World War II, Valdemar Langlet, head of the Swedish Red Cross in Budapest, with his wife Nina, and later the diplomat Raoul Wallenberg and 250 colleagues were working around the clock to save the Jewish population from being sent to Nazi concentration camps; this figure later rose to approximately 400. Lars and Edith Ernster, Jacob Steiner, and many others were housed at the Swedish Embassy in Budapest on Üllői Street 2-4 and 32 other buildings throughout the city which Wallenberg had rented and declared as extraterritorially Swedish to try to safeguard the residents.

Italian Giorgio Perlasca did the same, sheltering Jews in the Spanish Embassy.

On the night of 8 January 1945, an Arrow Cross execution brigade forced all the inhabitants of the building on Vadasz Street to the banks of the Danube. At midnight, Karoly Szabo and 20 policemen with drawn bayonets broke into the Arrow Cross house and rescued everyone (see also front page of 1947 newspaper below). Among those saved were Lars Ernster, who fled to Sweden and became a member of the board of the Nobel Foundation from 1977 to 1988, and Jacob Steiner, who fled to Israel and became a professor at the Hebrew University of Jerusalem. Steiner's father had been shot dead by Arrow Cross militiamen 25 December 1944, and fell into the Danube. His father had been an officer in World War I and spent four years as a prisoner of war in Russia.

Erwin K. Koranyi, a psychiatrist in Ottawa, wrote about the night of 8 January 1945 in his Dreams and Tears: Chronicle of a Life (2006), "in our group, I saw Lajos Stoeckler" and "The police holding their guns at the Arrowcross cutthroats. One of the high-ranking police officers was Pal Szalai, with whom Raoul Wallenberg used to deal. Another police officer in his leather coat was Karoly Szabo."

Pal Szalai was honored as Righteous Among the Nations on 7 April 2009 for helping save these Hungarian Jews.

Karoly Szabo was honored as Righteous Among the Nations on 12 November 2012.

== 2014 defacement ==
In September 2014, the Israeli newspaper Haaretz reported that several bronze shoes had been stolen from the Danube Holocaust memorial, citing the Budapest Beacon. Haaretz noted that "it was not immediately clear whether the theft in Budapest, not far from the Hungarian parliament building, was an antisemitic act or a meaningless prank. Police said they were not investigating the case because no crime has been reported, said Hungarian newspaper Nepszabadsag."

== 2023 desecration ==
In August 2023, the monument was desecrated again when a tourist, likely unaware of its significance, stepped into the shoes and posed with them to be photographed.

== Gallery ==
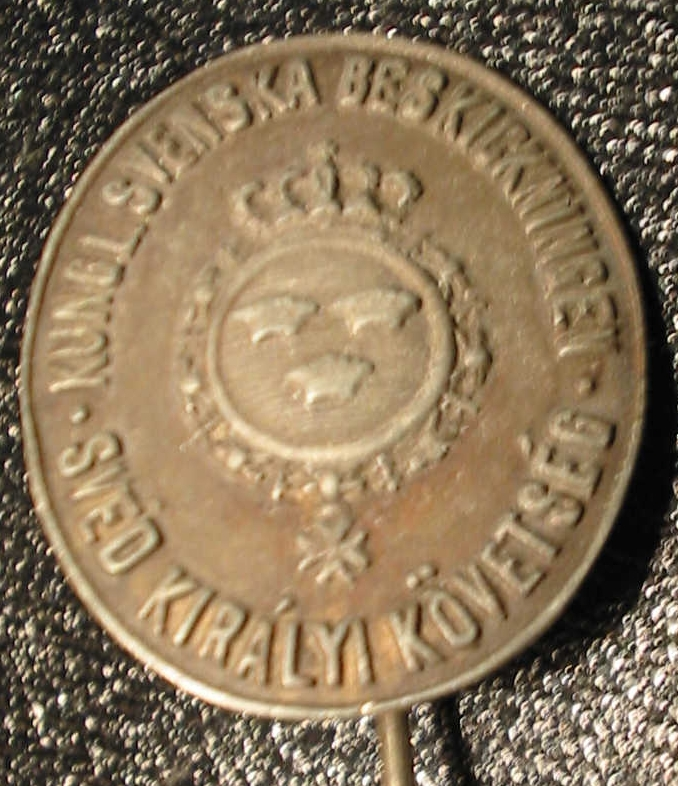
Swedish Legation Budapest 1944

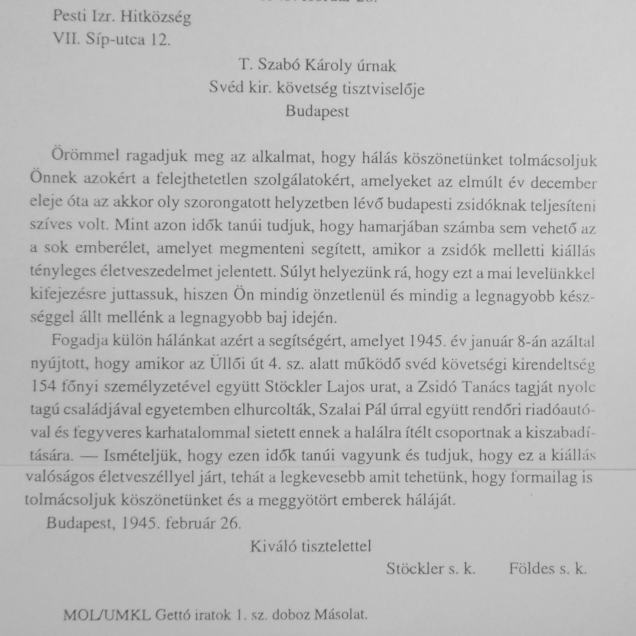
Document in the National Archives of Hungary 1945. Thank you letter from Lajos Stöckler, President of the Jewish Community of Budapest, to Károly Szabó for rescuing 154 persons and his family (8 persons).

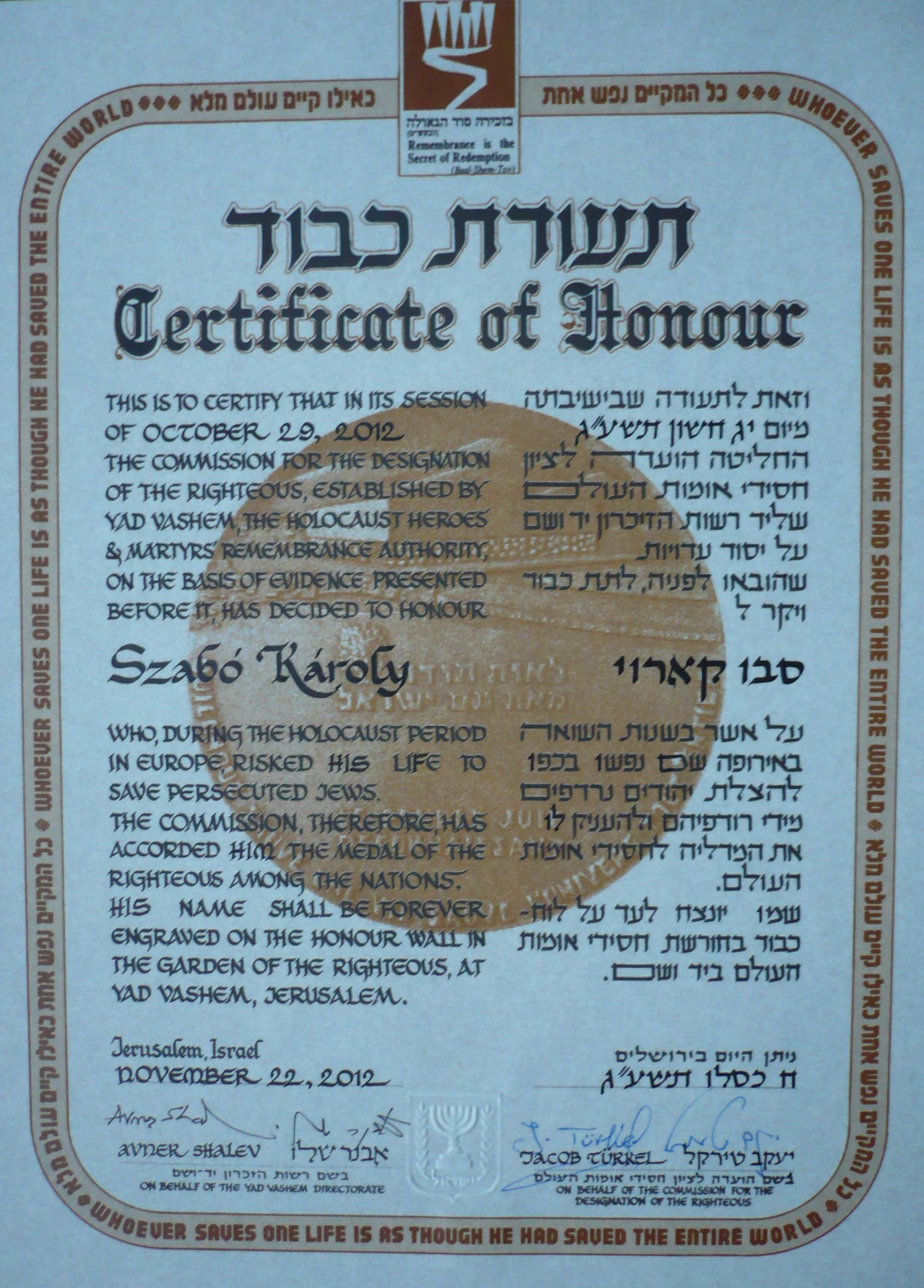
Károly Szabó – Righteous among the Nations

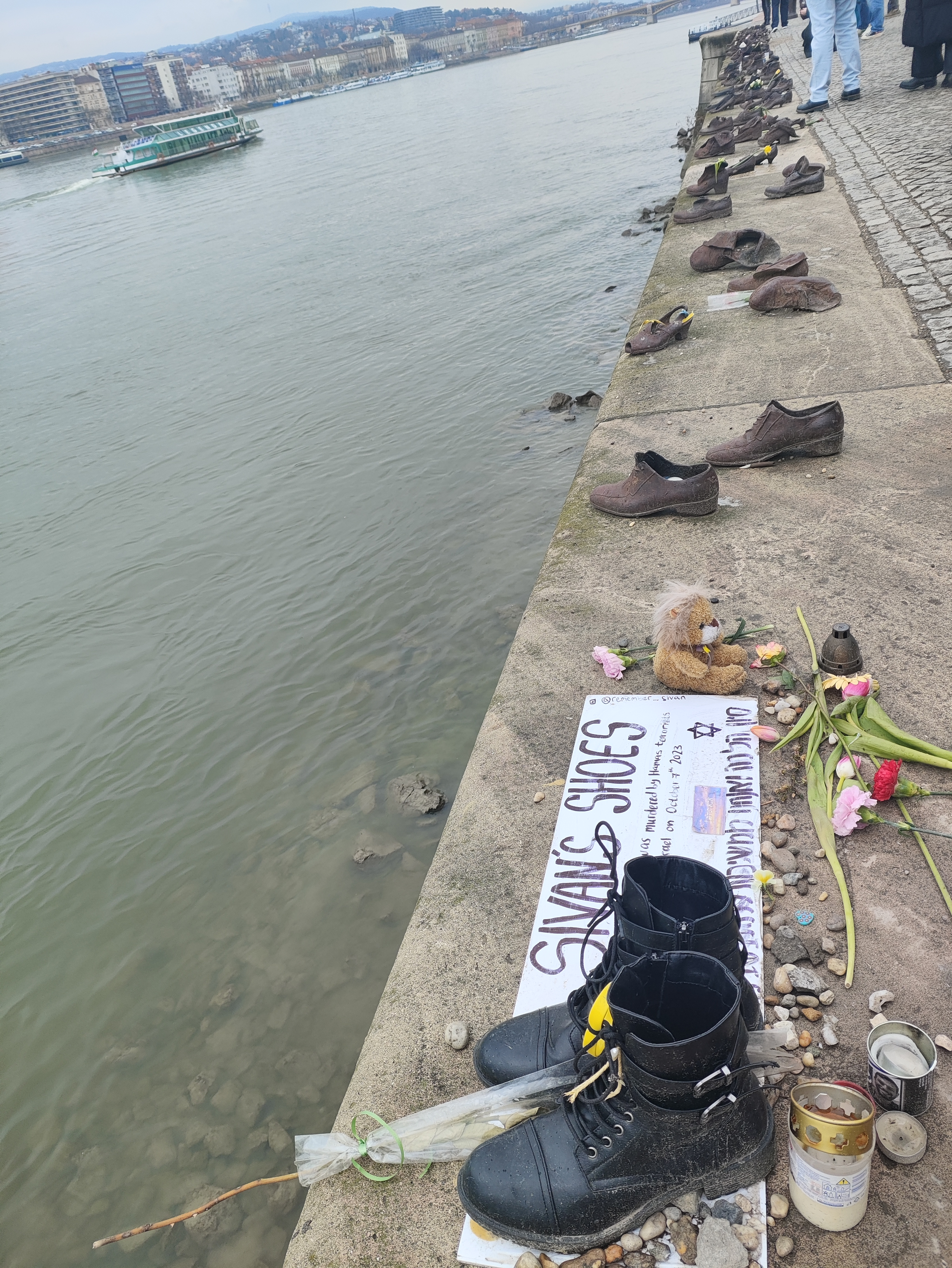
The shoes of Sivan Shahrabani, who was murdered in the Re'im music festival massacre, in the "Shoes on the Danube Bank" memorial

== See also ==
- Carl Lutz
- Miklós Vig
- The Holocaust in Hungary
- List of people who assisted Jews during the Holocaust

== Bibliography ==
- Gábor, Forgács (2006). Emlék és Valóság: mindennapjaim Raoul Wallenberggel [Recollections and Facts: My Days with Raoul Wallenberg] (in Hungarian). Budapest: Kolor Optika. ISBN 9789630600309.
- Koranyi, Erwin K. (2006). Dreams and Tears: Chronicle of a Life. General Store Publishing House. pp. 89–90. ISBN 978-1-897113-47-9.
- Szekeres, József (1997). A pesti gettok 1945 januari megmentese: "a magyar Schindler", Szalai Pal visszaemlekezesei es mas dokumentumok [Saving the Ghettos of Budapest in January 1945: "Hungarian Schindler," Pal Szalai's recollections]. Varostorteneti tanulmanyok (in Hungarian). Budapest: Budapest Fovaros Leveltara [Budapest Archives]. ISBN 978-963-7323-14-0.
