= State Protection Authority =

1945–1956 secret police of Communist Hungary

- Államvédelmi Hatóság

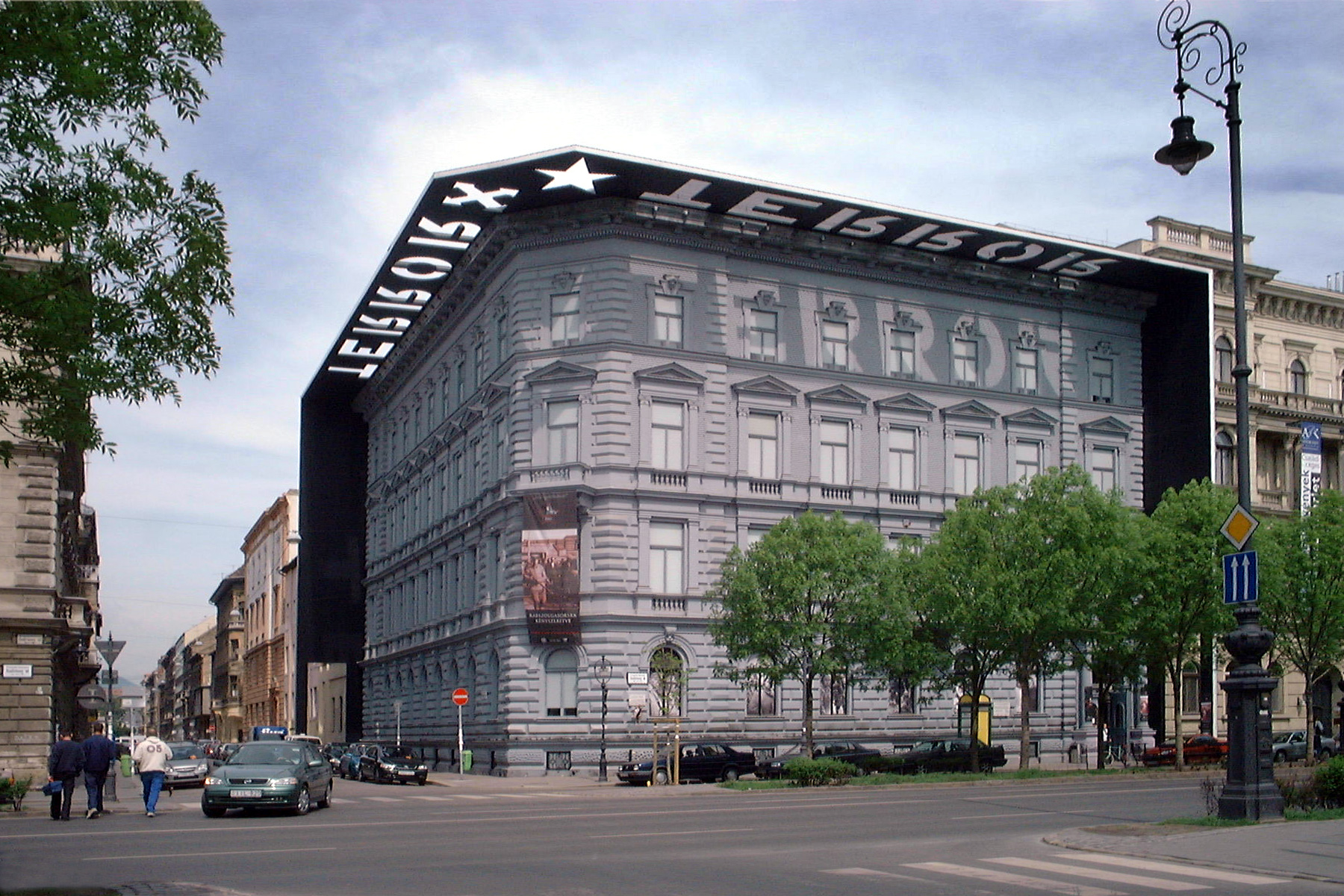
- House of Terror, the agency's headquarters

Agency overview
- Formed: 10 September 1948
- Preceding agencies: Main Command Political Department (PRO) (2 February 1945 – October 1946); State Protection Department (ÁVO) (October 1946 – September 1948)
- Dissolved: 28 October 1956 (declared) 7 November 1956 (confirmed)
- Superseding agency: Ministry of Internal Affairs III
- Type: Secret police
- Jurisdiction: Hungary
- Headquarters: Andrássy út 60., Budapest
- Employees: 30,000 (1953)
- Agency executives: Gábor Péter (1945–1953); László Piros (1953–1956)
- Parent agency: Ministry of Interior (until 1950)

The State Protection Authority (Note: Also translated as State Security Authority and State Defense Authority) (Hungarian: Államvédelmi Hatóság, ÁVH) was the secret police of the People's Republic of Hungary from 1945 to 1956. The ÁVH was conceived as an external appendage of the Soviet Union's KGB in Hungary responsible for supporting the ruling Hungarian Working People's Party and persecuting political criminals. The ÁVH gained a reputation for brutality during a series of purges but was gradually reined in under the government of Imre Nagy, a moderate reformer, after he was appointed Prime Minister of Hungary in 1953. The ÁVH was dissolved by Nagy's revolutionary government during the Hungarian Revolution of 1956 and succeeded by the Ministry of Internal Affairs III.

Archived data related to the ÁVH and the Ministry of Internal Affairs III are made available through the Historical Archives of the Hungarian State Security.

== History ==
In 1945 the Budapest Department of State Political Police, (Budapesti Főkapitányság Politikai Rendészeti Osztálya, PRO) was established. In 1946 it was reformed into the Hungarian State Police State Defense Department, (Magyar Államrendőrség Államvédelmi Osztálya, ÁVO). In 1950 it was reformed into the State Protection Authority, (Államvédelmi Hatóság, ÁVH). .

Between 1945 and 1952, Gábor Péter (Benjamin Eisenberger) was the absolute head of the State Protection Authority (Államvédelmi Hatóság), responsible for much cruelty, brutality and many political purges. László Rajk, the Communist Minister of Interior played a crucial role in organizing the State Protection Authority (ÁVH), but in 1949 he was one of its victims and on 1st of January 1950 the ÁVH became an independent authority and was removed from the authority of the Ministry of Interior and took over the Border Guard from the armed forces.

=== 1953 Wallenberg show trial preparations ===
ÁVH actions were not subject to judicial review and remained so until the early post-Stalin era. On April 7, 1953, early in the morning, Miksa Domonkos, one of the leaders of the Neologue Jewish community in Budapest was kidnapped by ÁVH officials to extract "confessions". Preparations for a show trial started in Budapest in 1953 to prove that Raoul Wallenberg had not been dragged off in 1945 to the Soviet Union but was the victim of rootless cosmopolitan Zionists. For the purposes of this show trial, two more Jewish leaders – Dr. László Benedek and Lajos Stöckler (a leader of Hungary's Neologue Jews) – as well as two would-be "eyewitnesses" – Pál Szalai and Károly Szabó – were arrested and interrogated by torture.

The last people to meet Wallenberg in Budapest were Otto Fleischmann, Károly Szabó, and Pál Szalai, who were invited to a supper at the Swedish Embassy building in Gyopár street on January 12, 1945. The next day, January 13, Wallenberg contacted the Russians. By 1953, Otto Fleischmann had left Hungary, working as a physician in Vienna, Antwerp, Ghent, Milan, Turin & Genoa.

On 8 April 1953, Károly Szabó was captured on the street and arrested without any legal procedure. His family had no news of him throughout the following six months. A secret trial was conducted against him of which no official record is available to date. After six months of interrogation, the defendants were driven to despair and exhaustion.

The idea that the "murderers of Wallenberg" were Budapest Zionists was primarily supported by Hungarian Communist leader and democratic reformer Ernő Gerő (a Hungarian of Jewish descent, born Ernő Singer), which is shown by a note sent by him to First Secretary Mátyás Rákosi (another non-Jewish Jew born as Mátyás Rosenfeld). The show trial was then initiated in Moscow, following Stalin's anti-Zionist campaign. After the death of Stalin and somewhat later execution of the former NKVD chief Lavrentiy Beria, the preparations for the trial were eventually stopped and the arrested persons were released in fall 1953 under condition that they are not to divulge any part of the arrest. Lajos Stöckler became severely impaired psychologically from torture. Miksa Domonkos spent a week in hospital and died shortly afterwards at home, mainly due to the torture he had been subjected to.

=== In Hungarian Revolution of 1956 ===
During the Hungarian Revolution of 1956, elements of the insurgents tracked down and killed both known and suspected ÁVH officers and informants. When the Revolution began, a crowd of some thousand people attacked the police headquarters in Budapest, shouting slogans such as "tear down the star!" and "free the prisoners!", referring to the enormous red star that stood on the building's roof, a symbol of communism and to the many prisoners kept inside. Fearing for the lives of both himself and his officers, the chief of the police let the crowd into the building, allowing them to take any political prisoners they wanted. During the revolution, the Imre Nagy government abolished the agency.

During and after the siege of the Hungarian Working People's Party headquarters (in Republic Square, Köztársaság tér), some members of the ÁVH were lynched, a fact later extensively used in party propaganda to back up the claim that the revolution was of a "fascistic, anti-Semitic and reactionary" nature.

=== Persecution by József Dudás' militia ===
Attacks on the ÁVH became a significant activity only as informal truces developed between the student-controlled combat organisations and the Soviet troops in Budapest. Freed from the necessity of immediate combat, the József Dudás militia planned a series of reprisals against ÁVH officers, informants, and on a few occasions against ordinary Communist-party members caught up in the revolution.

On October 29, in the second week of the revolution, the Dudás militia attacked the headquarters of the secret police in Budapest, massacring the ÁVH inside. This event was well documented by both western and eastern journalists and photographers, and constituted the primary evidence against Imre Nagy and other members of his cabinet in the White Books.

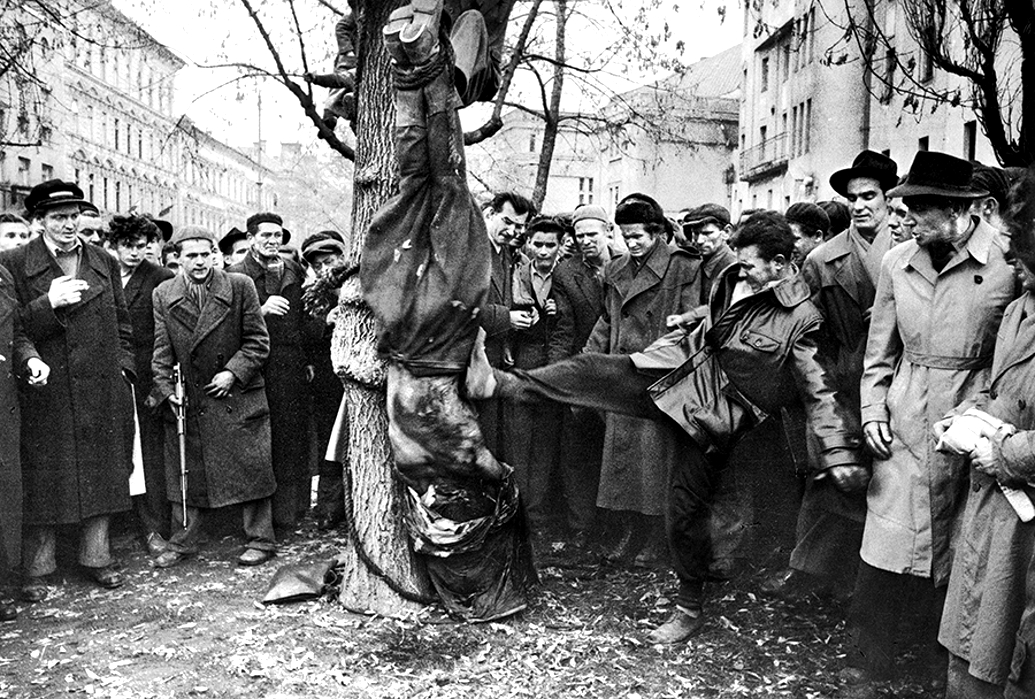
Protesters kicking the body of a slain ÁVH soldier

A Western eyewitness said:

The secret police lie twisted in the gutter [...] the Hungarians will not touch the corpse of an ÁVH man, not even to close the eyes or straighten the neck.

After Dudás' militia assaulted the building, the surrounding crowd lynched a number of ÁVH officers. Highly visible in photographs of this attack are the party's paybooks displayed on to the corpses, demonstrating that ÁVH soldiers received at least 10 times the wages of a manual worker.

When the students' and workers' councils discovered what the Dudás group was doing, they instituted armed patrols to arrest and detain ÁVH members for their own safety, and for future planned trials. As a result of Dudás' massacres, and the students' policy of arrest, many ÁVH voluntarily turned themselves in to students' or workers' councils to seek protective custody. This was a reflection of the shared student-worker policy of keeping the revolution pure and bloodless. Dudás was sought for arrest by the students' and workers' councils.

Unsurprisingly, when the Warsaw Pact intervened in the revolution to support the government, ÁVH officers carried out brutal reprisals against those who had killed their comrades. The ÁVH generally targeted all revolutionaries, and received significant assistance from the Soviet Union's security apparatus, who arrested the Nagy government, General Pál Maléter, and deported one student and workers to the Soviet Union.

=== House of Terror ===
Shortly after the Arrow Cross Party left it, the building under the address 60 Andrássy Avenue became the ÁVH Headquarters. The building is now a museum called The House of Terror, commemorating the victims of both political systems.

=== End of ÁVH ===
The subsequent government of János Kádár did not wish to resurrect the ÁVH under this name after 1956 (Kádár was tortured by the ÁVH in the 1950s), yet it flourished in the system of the Ministry of Interior (Hungarian BM). This should be considered in the light of the use of the Soviet security apparatus directly in Hungary after the 1956 revolution, and in preparation for the trial of Nagy and "his accomplices". Between 1956 and 1963 Kádár, a natural opportunist, fought an inner party battle against hardline Stalinists, although he accepted the services of many cruel former AVH torturers.

Kádár's victory was signalled in 1963 by a general amnesty for the 1956 revolutionaries, an indication of the absence of a political police. Hungary would go on to be the only Warsaw Pact country without a formal intelligence service, since all intelligence and espionage functions were vested in the AVH, and later the Hungarian Ministry of Interior.

== Duties ==
While the security apparatus was operating, it supported the Hungarian Working People's Party (MDP) directly, with little reference made to Government norms. This support was primarily through the secret gathering of intelligence, largely through a vast network of informants, like the system used by the Ministry for State Security (Stasi) in the German Democratic Republic.

The investigation network was supplemented with a mechanism of secret arrests, followed by extensive periods of torture (lasting between 3 and 18 months). When the apparatus had extracted confessions of varying quality from a prisoner, the State's system of public procurators and courts would be called in to make a ruling on the sentence. This was the norm of operation for the ÁVH, and was diverged from in matters of only utmost state security; for example, the illegal arrest and indefinite solitary detention of the Communist Party of Great Britain operative Edith Bone. Despite the forced nature of confessions, retractions at trial were not considered a danger to the process, due to the obvious threat of continued torture during a recess of the trial.

=== International activities ===
The ÁVH also assisted the Soviet sphere security apparatus by staging show trials. In two cases, the ÁVH was given the privilege of leading an attack on undesired elements throughout Hungary. In 1948 the Roman Catholic Cardinal József Mindszenty was tried and imprisoned. In 1949, the ÁVH arrested Hungarian Communist Party member László Rajk, who was then tried and executed for nationalism and Titoism in a show trial that signified to the international communist movement that Yugoslavia was now a threat. (László Rajk was the man who had organised the ÁVH.)

=== Concentration camps ===
Following sentence, political prisoners were imprisoned. To serve this purpose, more penal institutions (the prison in Vác, the transit prison, the state security prison in Mosonyi Street) and internment camps (in Kistarcsa, Recsk, Tiszalök, Kazincbarcika and according to the latest research, in Bernátkút and Sajóbábony) were placed under the supervision of the State Protection Authority. The most notorious of these camps were in Recsk, Kistarcsa, Tiszalök and Kazincbarcika.

These camps were mixed and varied. Early camps tended to be cruder and more cruel. In particular, the status of ex-party members varied. In camps prior to 1953 they were more harshly treated than other prisoners. After 1953, ex-party members were a virtual aristocracy within prisons. Additionally, prior to 1953 certain camps had as their goal the eventual death of inmates due to overwork and maltreatment. In a number of cases, torture was an essential part of camp life and discipline.

Imre Nagy's first government from 1953 to 1955 vastly improved conditions in the camps and halted the efforts to exterminate political prisoners.

See also: Kistarcsa Central Internment Camp

== Successor ==
The Hungarian Ministry of Interior created the Ministry of Internal Affairs III for domestic and foreign intelligence purposes until the end of the Cold War. It operated with considerably more restraint than the ÁVH.
