= Károly Szabó =

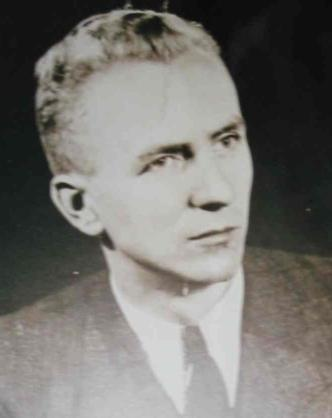
- Károly Szabó circa 1944–1945
- Born: November 17, 1916; Budapest, Austria-Hungary
- Died: October 28, 1964 (aged 47); Budapest, Hungary
- Occupation: Office machinery mechanic
- Spouse: Margit Vásárhelyi

Károly Szabó (November 17, 1916 – October 28, 1964) was an employee of the Swedish Embassy in Budapest from 1944 to 1945 when he rescued Hungarian Jews during the Holocaust. He was a supporter of Raoul Wallenberg and had a significant role in making contact with the representatives of the Hungarian police and other state officials. He was arrested without legal proceedings in 1953 in Budapest, in a secret trial.

He was honored as Righteous Among the Nations on November 12, 2012.

== Friendship with Pál Szalai 1929 ==
In the Hungarian Boy Scouts in 1929 he (13 years old) became friends with Pál Szalai. This friendship continued in the critical months of 1944–1945 while Pál Szalai, high-ranking member of the police force, supported Raoul Wallenberg.

== Budapest 1944–1945 ==
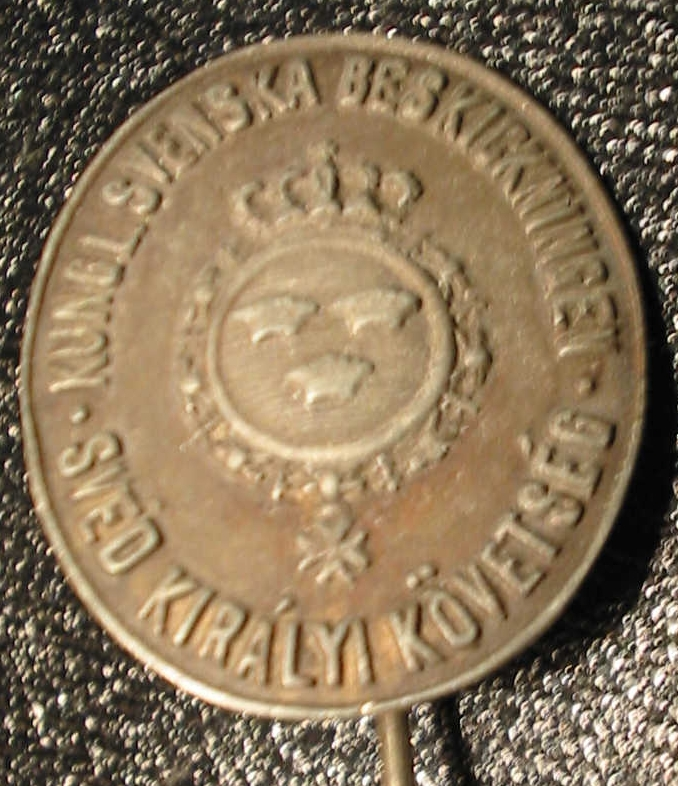
Swedish Legation Budapest 1944 - Badge Karoly Szabo

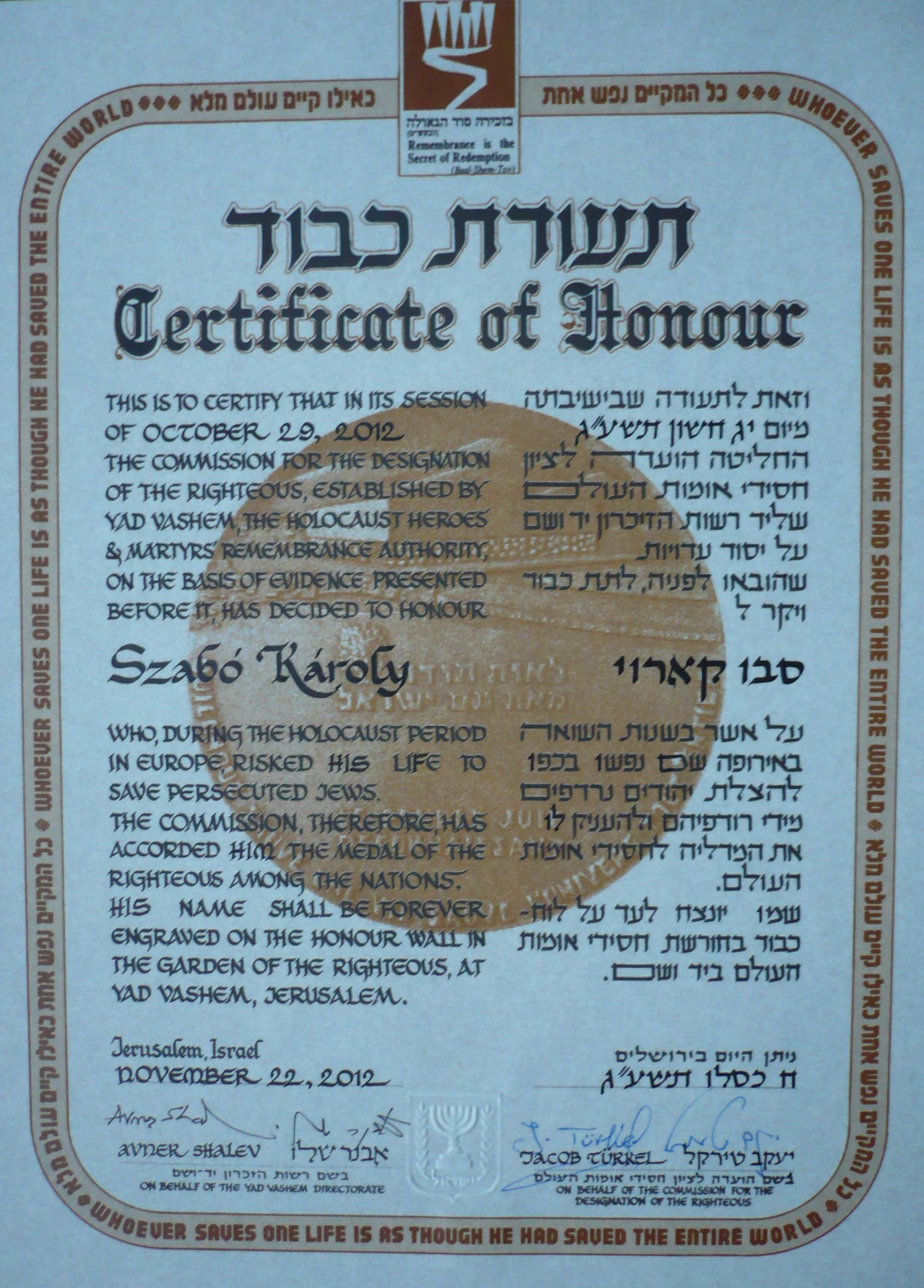
Károly Szabó "Certitficate of Honour"

Between 1944 and 1945 Károly Szabó was one of the typewriter mechanics of the Swedish Embassy. Dr. Otto Fleischmann, a Doctor of Medicine and psychologist, employee of the Swedish Embassy, motivated Károly Szabó to play an active role in the rescue actions of Raoul Wallenberg. Pál Szalai supported his friend with important personal documents, signed by the German command in the Battle of Budapest. Karoly Szabó's intuitive purchase decision for a leather coat was another key factor. Black leather trench coat, was a means of inspiring fear and respect, and the subsequent Hollywood image of the black-clad, trench-coated Gestapo officer has entered popular culture. In Budapest's Jewish community he was known as "the mysterious man in the leather coat".

Károly Szabó attracted exceptional attention on December 24, 1944, as Hungarian Arrow Cross Party members occupied the Embassy building on Gyopár street. He rescued 36 kidnapped employees from the Budapest ghetto. This action attracted Raoul Wallenberg's interest. He agreed to meet Szabó's influential friend, Pál Szalai, a high-ranking member of the police force. The meeting took place in the night of December 26. This meeting was preparation to save the Budapest ghetto in January 1945. Pál Szalai was honored as Righteous among the Nations April 7, 2009.

The last meeting between Wallenberg and Szalai, together with Dr. Otto Fleischmann and Károly Szabó, was on the evening of January 12, 1945, at the Gyopár street Swedish Embassy at Wallenberg's "last supper" invitation. The next day – on January 13 – Wallenberg contacted the Russians to secure food and supplies for the people under his protection. He was detained by the Soviet forces on January 17, 1945.

=== Prevented crime in January 1945 ===
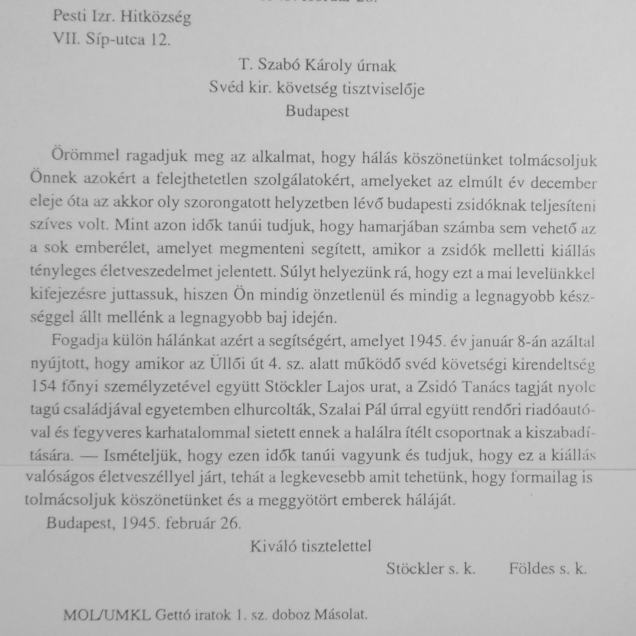
Document in the National Archives of Hungary 1945. Thank from Lajos Stöckler, President of the Jewish Community of Budapest for rescuing 154 persons and his family (8 persons).

During World War II Lars Ernster and Jacob Steiner lived in the office of the Swedish Embassy in Budapest, Üllői Street 2-4. In the night of January 8, 1945, all inhabitants were dragged away to near the Danube banks by an Arrow Cross party execution brigade. At midnight, 20 policemen with drawn bayonets broke into the Arrow Cross (Nyilas) house and rescued everyone. Ernster and Steiner were among the rescued. Ernster fled to Sweden, where later he was member of the Board of Nobel Foundation (1977–88), and Steiner fled to Israel, where he is now a professor at the Hebrew University of Jerusalem.

Information from Jacob Steiner after he has read this page: on December 25, 1944, Steiner's father was shot dead by Arrow Cross militiamen, falling into the Danube as a result. His father had been an officer in World War I and spent 4 years as a prisoner of war in Russia.

Dr. Erwin K. Korányi a psychiatrist in Ottawa, wrote about the night of January 8, 1945, in his "Chronicle of a Life" "in our group, I saw Lajos Stöckler" and "The police holding their guns at the Arrow Cross cutthroats. One of the high-ranking police officers was Paul Szálai, with whom Raoul Wallenberg used to deal. Another police officer in his leather coat was Károly Szabo."

=== 1947–1964 ===
- At the invitation from the Wallenberg family Károly Szabó visited Stockholm in summer 1947. He was one of the last three persons who had seen Raoul Wallenberg in Budapest.
- In the autumn of 1947 he visited the rescued family Jakobovics in Amsterdam. His visit made headlines in Dutch newspapers Het Vrije Volk.
- In the summer of 1963 and 1964 he visited at invitation the rescued Kalber and Löw in Basel and Jakobovics in London.

==== Show trial preparations 1953 in Hungary ====
The idea that the "murderers of Wallenberg" were Budapest Zionists was primarily supported by Hungarian Communist leader Ernő Gerő, which is shown by a note sent by him to First Secretary Mátyás Rákosi.

In 1953 preparations for a show trial started in Budapest to prove that Wallenberg had never been in the Soviet Union, nobody had dragged off Wallenberg in 1945, least of all the Soviet Army. Three leaders of the Jewish community of Budapest and former officials of the Central Jewish Council – Dr. László Benedek, Lajos Stöckler, Miksa Domonkos, and two additional eyewitnesses – Pál Szalai and Károly Szabó – were arrested, accused and tortured. Everything was ready for a trial designed to prove that Wallenberg had been the victim of cosmopolitan Zionists. The witness' forced confessions detailed how they saw Stöckler in the basement of the American Embassy standing over Wallenberg's dead body with a smoking pistol still in his hand.

Documents, prison inventory: preparations for Wallenberg show trial in Budapest 1953

Károly Szabó arrested without legal proceedings on April 8, 1953 (inventory in prison)

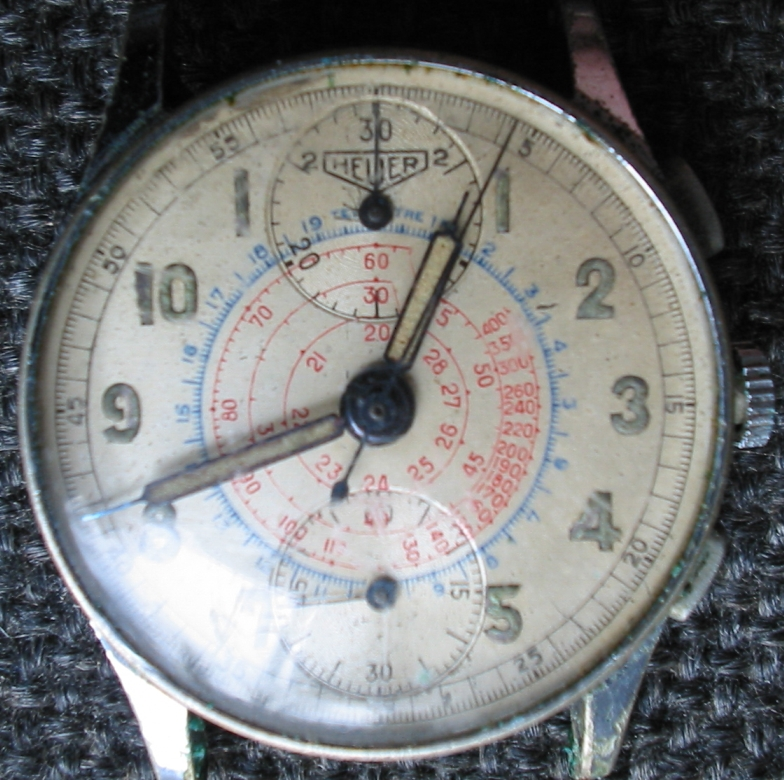
TAG Heuer sports watch (on prison inventory)

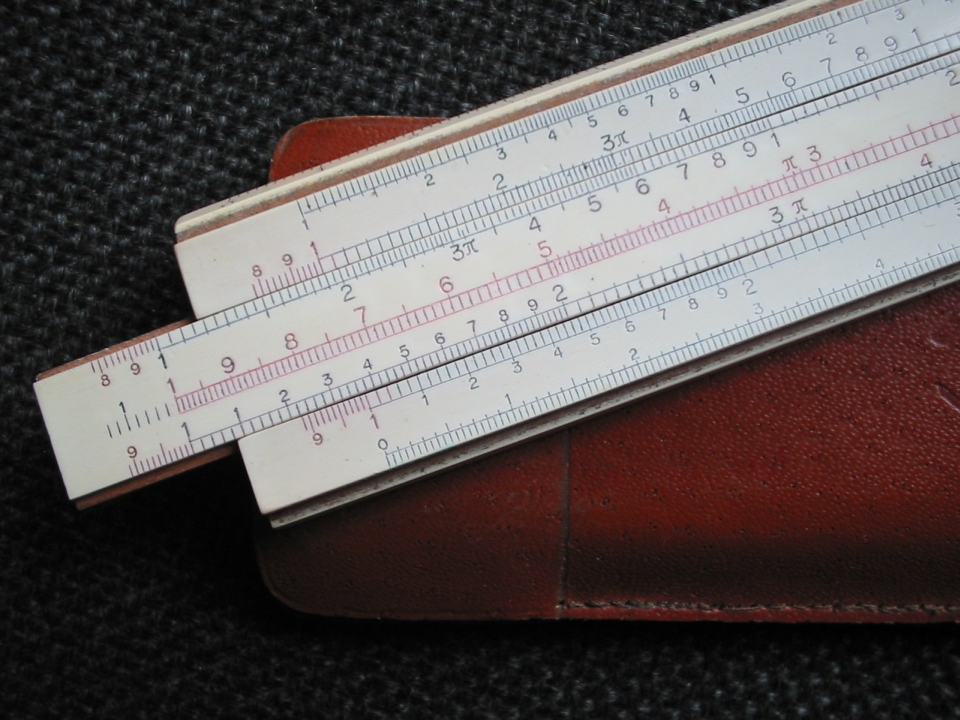
Slide rule (on prison inventory)

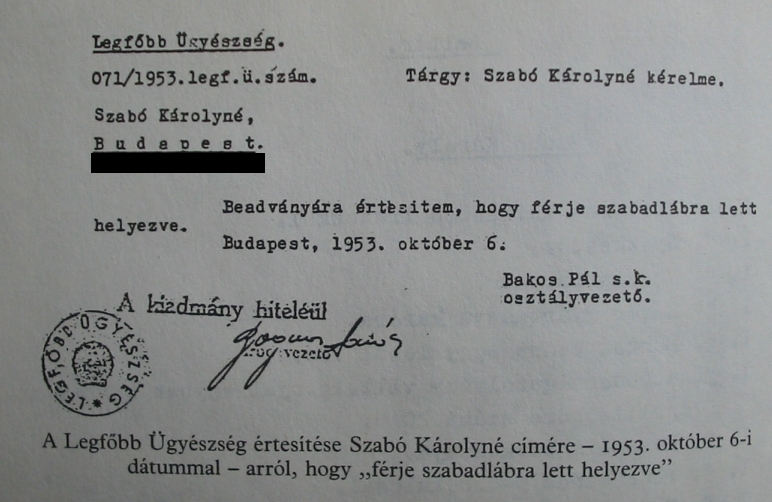
After six months, Károly Szabó was released on October 6. 1953 (Highest Prosecutor)

On April 8, 1953, Szabó was captured on the street, arrested without legal proceedings, and sent to prison. His family did not hear from him for six months. A secret trial was held and no official record of the case or the judge's verdict was made available. After six months of interrogation, the defendants were driven to despair and exhaustion.

The show trial was initiated in Moscow, following Joseph Stalin's anti-Zionist campaign. After Stalin's death and Lavrentiy Beria's execution, the preparations for the Wallenberg trial ended and the witnesses were released. Miksa Domonkos died shortly after the tortures in hospital (Book: Mária Ember, They Wanted to Blame Us, 1992). Lajos Stöckler was convicted of foreign currency charges, persistent disloyalty, and unfit to participate in public affairs. Stöckler was sentenced to 5.5 years in prison and fifty percent of his assets were confiscated as penalty. Although conditionally released in late 1954 and later pardoned in 1956 he had become psychologically impaired and died in 1960.

== Timeline ==
- 1916 Born on November 17, 1916, in Budapest.
- 1932–1940 Works for the Remington US typewriter company in Budapest
- 1940–1945 Works for Brunsviga German calculators company in Budapest (Gelpke, Nádor tér) and mechanic for bureau equipment on the Swedish Embassy Budapest 1944–1945
- 1945–1949 owner of the "Universal" bureau equipment company with Plachy and Wagner representatives for Brunsviga (German), Precisa (Swiss), Odhner (Swedish) calculating machines in Hungary.
- 1950 His business was "nationalized" (expropriated without compensation)
- 1953 Arrested and secret show trial preparations
- 1955–1964 Independent technician for office equipment
- 1963–1964 In the summer of 1963 and 1964 he visited at invitation the rescued Klaber and Löw in Basel and Jakobovics in London.
- 1964 Death by stroke October 28, 1964, in Budapest.

== Posthumous honors ==
On August 4, 2010, the birthday of Raoul Wallenberg the International Mensch Foundation, the Carl Lutz Foundation, the Budapest Holocaust Memorial Institute and the 1944–2004 Foundation issued a Karoly Szabo memorial certificate.

After introduction by Prof. Dr. Szabolcs Szita speech Aliza Bin-Noun Israel Ambassador, Dr. John Hóvári Ambassador Deputy Secretary of State, Prof. Dr. Schweitzer Joseph retired National Rabbi.

== See also ==
- Shoes on the Danube Promenade
- Battle of Budapest
- Budapest ghetto
- Raoul Wallenberg
- Pál Szalai
- Lajos Stockler
- Lars Ernster
- Jacob Steiner
- Collection from Karoly Szabo newspaper headlines Hungarian Revolution of 1956

== Books, newspaper ==
- Dreams and Tears: Chronicle of a Life, Erwin K. Koranyi, General Store Publishing House, 2006, ISBN 978-1-897113-47-9 (pages 89 – 90)
- A Man for All Connections, The Wallenberg-Szalai connection, Andrew Handler, Praeger/Greenwood, 30 January 1996; ISBN 978-0-275-95214-3 Handler focuses on explaining the Hungarian political context which made rescue possible.... Less well known is the fact that Wallenberg's mission was supported by various representatives of the Hungarian state apparatus
- József Szekeres: Saving the Ghettos of Budapest in January 1945, Pál Szalai "the Hungarian Schindler" ISBN 978-963-7323-14-0, Budapest 1997, Publisher: Budapest Archives
- The mystery man with the leather coat. Faklya - Budapest, December 29, 1946 - February 9, 1947, interviews with Károly Szabó (Hungarian)
