= August Aichhorn =

Austrian educator, psychoanalyst, and social worker

- Born: July 27, 1878; Vienna, Austria-Hungary
- Died: October 13, 1949 (aged 71); Vienna, Austria
- Occupations: Educator, psychoanalyst, social worker

August Aichhorn (Austrian German: [ˈaɪçhɔrn]; July 27, 1878 – October 13, 1949) was an Austrian educator, psychoanalyst, and social worker.

== Career ==
Aichhorn was initially an elementary school teacher in Vienna, and in 1918, following World War I was responsible for setting up educational centers for problem youth in Lower Austria. His success in this endeavor led him to be encouraged by Anna Freud (1895–1982) to enroll in psychoanalytic training at the Vienna Psychoanalytic Institute in 1922. Soon afterwards, Aichhorn set up a child guidance service for the Vienna Psychoanalytic Society. Prior to and during World War II he was a training analyst for psychiatrists in Vienna, and following the war Aichhorn and his former student Otto Fleischmann took legal maneuvers to reopen the Vienna Psychoanalytic Society, which was later renamed the “August Aichhorn Gesellschaft”.

The city of Vienna was a lifelong source of strength and vitality for Aichhorn. Heinz Kohut said of him: “He knew every shade of dialect, every nuance of local habits, depending on regional and class differences. He knew it all without effort because it was his medium of life.”

August Aichhorn is considered to be one of the founders of psychoanalytic education. He is remembered for his work with juvenile delinquent and disadvantaged youth. He believed that imposed discipline and suppression which were practiced in traditional reformatories, yielded few positive results. Aichhorn was known for his intuitive talents in dealing with the antisocial nature of troubled adolescents, and his unorthodox approach in handling their aggressive tendencies. Aichhorn was an advocate of the idea that there was a distinction between manifest and latent delinquency, and believed that arrested development in youth was a precursor to antisocial behavior. He also believed that this situation was caused by disturbances in early child-parent relationships.

Aichhorn was known for his ability to improvise with patients and thus overcome impasses. Heinz Kohut once said the following of Aichhorn:

If a patient’s hostility was hidden behind a rigid mask of good manners, Aichhorn might solemnly shake hands at the beginning of the hour. But then—to the surprised annoyance of the recipient of the “handshake”—Aichhorn kept his hand limp (the well-known practical joke of children) without otherwise indicating by the slightest change in his facial expression that he was joking. If another patient’s guilt feelings toward him had to be diminished in order to become available for analysis, he would ask small symbolic favors, for instance, he would ask the patient to buy a newspaper for him or a package of cigarettes. If, on the other hand, he felt that the patient was keeping guilt feelings or other related conflicts out of the transference, he would mobilize them effectively by simply asking the patient to make out his own bill at the end of the next month. Aichhorn’s wealth in variations of technical devices seemed inexhaustible because it was the expression of his psychological genius; for him, every psychological situation was new, living, and fascinating.

Aichhorn was the first analyst of young Heinz Kohut in 1938–39, before Kohut went into exile first in England and then in the United States. Of other later prominent American psychoanalysts, Aichhorn also analyzed Kurt R. Eissler.

Aichhorn's best known written work was his 1925 Verwahrloste Jugend (‘Wayward Youth’), which is still regarded as a relevant resource. This was in fact the only book he wrote, but his students have edited collections of his writings.

The “August Aichhorn Center for Adolescent Residential Care” in New York City is named after him.

== Writings in book form ==
- Verwahrloste Jugend: Die Psychoanalyse in d. Fürsorgeerziehung; 10 Vorträge zur ersten Einführung (preface by Sigmund Freud), Wien: Internationaler Psychoanalytischer Verlag, 1925, last edition: 11th ed. Bern: Huber, 2005, ISBN 3-456-84260-0. (Engl. Wayward Youth, New York: Viking Press, 1935, also: Northwestern University Press, Reprint 1984. (Also translated into Finnish, French, Italian, Spanish, and Swedish.))

== Posthumous collections ==
- Erziehungsberatung und Erziehungshilfe: 12 Vorträge über psychoanalytische Pädagogik; aus dem Nachlaß August Aichhorns. Verfasserangabe August Aichhorn. Mit einem Beitr. von Heinrich Meng, Huber (Bern), 1959. Paperback Edition: Reinbek (near Hamburg): Rowohlt, 1972.
- Psychoanalyse und Erziehungsberatung, Beiträge zur Kinderpsychotherapie; 7. Reinhardt (München), 1970. 126 S.

== Sources ==
English

- Kurt R. Eissler (ed.): Searchlights on Delinquency. New Psychoanalytic Studies. Dedicated to Professor August Aichhorn, on the Occasion of his Seventieth Birthday, July 27, 1948. New York.
  - Contributions: Ernest Jones, Kurt R. Eissler, Paul Federn, Heinrich Meng, Oskar Pfister, Laureta Benda, Joseph B. Cramer, Kata F. Levy, Margaret S. Mahler, Ernst Simmel, Editha Sterba, S. A. Szurek, John M. Dorsey, Willi Hoffer, Hyman S. Lipman, C.P. Oberndorf, Melitta Schmideberg, Anna Freud, Kate Friedländer, Margaret E. Fries, Adelaide M Johnson, Jeanne Lampl-de Groot, Fritz Wittels, M. Woolf, Paul Bergman, Dorothy T. Burlingham, Ruth S. Eissler, Martin Grotjahn, Fritz Redl, Gregory Zilboorg, Edith Jacobson, Paul Reiwald, Hans Zulliger, Dorothy Archibald, G. Bose, Edward Glover, Nelly H. C. Tibout.
- Heinz Kohut: “August Aichhorn—Remarks After His Death”. In: Paul H. Ornstein: The Search for the Self, Vol. I (1978), pp. 131–133.
- Paul Kramer: “In Memoriam August Aichhorn” in: Psychoanalytic Quarterly, 1949
- Ernst Federn: “The therapeutic personality, as illustrated by Paul Federn and August Aichhorn” in: Psychoanalytic Quarterly, Vol 36. 1962.
- Edith Buxbaum, “Three great Psychoanalytic Educators (Bernfeld, Aichhorn, A. Freud)” in. The Reiss Davis Clinic Bulletin, Vol. 3, No. 1. Los Angeles.1966
- Georg Mohr, “August Aichhorn. Friend of the Wayward Youth” In: Alexander, F., Eisenstein, S., Grotjahn, M. (Ed.): Psychoanalytic Pioneers, New York, 1966
- Paul Kramer, “Introduction” in: August Aichhorn: Delinquency and Child Guidance, New York, 1967
- J. E. Schowalter: “Aichhorn revisited” in: The Psychoanalytic Study of the Child. 2000;55:49–60.

German

- Thomas Aichhorn: Wer war August Aichhorn. Briefe, Dokumente, Unveröffentlichte Arbeiten. Löcker & Wögenstein, Wien 1976.
- Thomas Aichhorn (Hrsg.): Zur Geschichte der Wiener Psychoanalytischen Vereinigung. Band 1: 1938–1949. Edition Diskord, Tübingen 2003.
- Ernst Federn: „Die therapeutische Persönlichkeit, erläutert am Beispiel von Paul Federn und August Aichhorn“. In: Ders.: Ein Leben mit der Psychoanalyse. Von Wien über Buchenwald und die USA zurück nach Wien. Psychosozial-Verlag, Wien 1999, ISBN 3-932133-86-2.
- Roland Kaufhold: „Zur Geschichte und Aktualität der Psychoanalytischen Pädagogik: Fragen an Rudolf Ekstein und Ernst Federn“. In: Roland Kaufhold (Hrsg.): Pioniere der Psychoanalytischen Pädagogik: Bruno Bettelheim, Rudolf Ekstein, Ernst Federn und Siegfried Bernfeld. Psychosozial-Verl., Gießen 1993, ISBN 3-930096-23-4 (=psychosozial 53, Jg. 16, Heft 1), S. 9–19.
- Roland Kaufhold: „Spurensuche zur Geschichte der die USA emigrierten Wiener Psychoanalytischen Pädagogen“ In: Thomas Aichhorn (Hrsg.): Zur Geschichte der Wiener Psychoanalytischen Vereinigung. Band 1: 1938–1949. Edition Diskord, Tübingen 2003, S. 37–69.
- Achim Perner, „Der Beitrag August Aichhorns zur Technik der Psychoanalyse” in: Luzifer Amor — Heft 36, Zur Geschichte der psychoanalytischen Technik
