= Lajos Stöckler =

Hungarian Jewish community leader

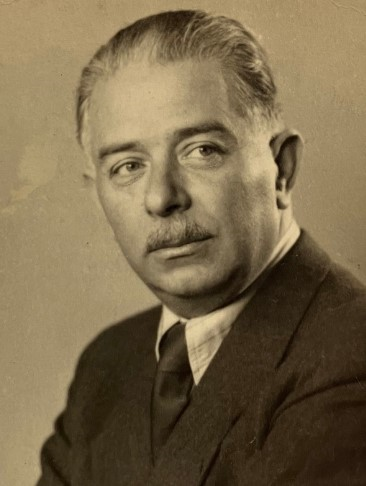
Lajos Stöckler circa 1947

Lajos Stöckler (Louis Stockler) 21 January 1897 – 1 June 1960 was a Hungarian Jewish industrialist, who served as a member of the Third and Fourth Jewish Councils which were established following the German invasion of Hungary. During the Szálasi fascist regime, he became de facto head of the Jewish Council of Budapest which administered the Budapest Ghetto. As one of the leaders of the Neolog Jewish community during World War II and during the subsequent communist regime, he played a role of historic significance and remains a controversial figure in Hungarian Jewry's history.

From 1945 to 1953, Stöckler was elected and served as President of the (Buda)Pest Israelite Congregation and the National Office of Hungarian Israelites, as well as being appointed agency head for the National Representation of Hungarian Israelites, forcefully set up by the pro-Soviet regime.

== Biography ==
=== Early life and career ===
Stöckler was born the son of Adolf Stöckler and Johanna (Janka), née Steiner. He was married to Magdolna Török, and together they were the parents of sons Gábor (1929) and György (1932).

In 1914, at the age of 17, Stöckler was drafted to the Imperial and Royal Army and fought in World War I. Stöckler was promoted as a 2nd lieutenant / Military-Major (Hungarian: hadnagy) and sent to the Eastern Front, where he was captured and interned as a prisoner of war in a camp in Irbit, Russia.

In 1930, Stöckler started his own lace-making business with significant financial support from his father-in-law, Béla Török. The factory was equipped with English lace machinery, and due to the significant investment, it operated 24 hours a day at its peak, with approximately 20 employees. The factory was located in Kender Utca in Józsefváros (8th district of Budapest; now Aurora utca) and later became the family's place of hiding during the Arrow Cross' reign of terror until the building was severely damaged by Allied bombings. The business was later nationalized but quickly closed, with all property and equipment having been seized by the Communist government.

=== During the Holocaust ===
When the Arrow Cross Party took power on 15 October 1944, Samu Stern at first remained the nominal head of the Jewish Council of Budapest albeit in hiding, and during this precarious period Stöckler stepped into leadership roles vacated by others who were in hiding or had fled such as Rezső Kasztner. However, no one suspected at the time, that Stöckler would later come to play a role of historic significance.

"He [Stöckler] soon emerged as a gadfly on the council challenging the secrecy with which the top leaders conducted their deliberations and reached decisions for which the entire council were to be made responsible for. He [later] summarised his opposition to the triumvirate in his condemnatory sworn testimony to State Police."

Stöckler and family also deviated from the other members of the Jewish Council of Budapest by refusing to take advantage of the opportunity offered by Regent Miklós Horthy exemption policies and they continued to wear the yellow star in solidarity with the Jewish masses. He is recognized for working tirelessly in his role as the Budapest Jewish community's head of the Budapest Ghetto and alongside Raoul Wallenberg on an almost certain daily basis.

In December 1944, during the brutal Siege of Budapest and the Arrow Cross' indiscriminate reign of terror also at its peak, Wallenberg arranged for Stöckler and his extended family to relocate to the 'safety' of the basement of the 'protected' Swedish Embassy at 2-4 Üllői Street. Amidst ferocious street battles and Soviet versus German and Hungarian troops now moving from house to house the Arrow Cross turned their guns on the most helpless targets including patients in the city's two Jewish hospitals. As order continued to collapse, Arrow Cross members escalated their indiscriminate attacks and murder of Jews.

On January 8, 1945, while Stöckler had been away attending to official council matters, the Jewish inhabitants of the embassy were dragged out and began to be marched towards the Danube banks by an Arrow Cross execution brigade. Having been alerted to the upheaval Stöckler rushed back to the embassy and immediately concluded the group faced almost certain death. He phoned Raoul Wallenberg to alert him of the perilous situation and then caught up and joined the rest of his family in the march and declared to his wife and sons, "If we go, we go together".

The death march was forcibly intercepted by police enroute and the group were returned under escort to the Swedish Embassy. Dr. Erwin K. Korányi, wrote about the night of January 8, 1945, in his autobiographical 'Chronicle of a Life'. "In our group, I saw Lajos Stöckler a member of the Judenrat" and "The police holding their guns at the Arrow Cross cutthroats. One of the high-ranking police officers was Pál Szalai, with whom Raoul Wallenberg used to deal. Another police officer in his leather coat was Károly Szabó".

=== Post-war Political life ===
After the war, “Stöckler remained an active, though highly controversial leader, even after the liberation”. He represented Hungarian Jewry both domestically and internationally including the World Jewish Congress. He was elected as President of the Pest Israelite Congregation and the National Office of Hungarian Israelites, as well as agency head for the National Representation of Hungarian Israelites, forcefully set up by the pro-Soviet regime. He held these elected positions until his later arrest in January 1953.

In May 1946, he swore a deposition before the Political Criminal Division of the Hungarian State Police who were considering his indictment for possible collaboration with the Nazi Gestapo during the occupation.

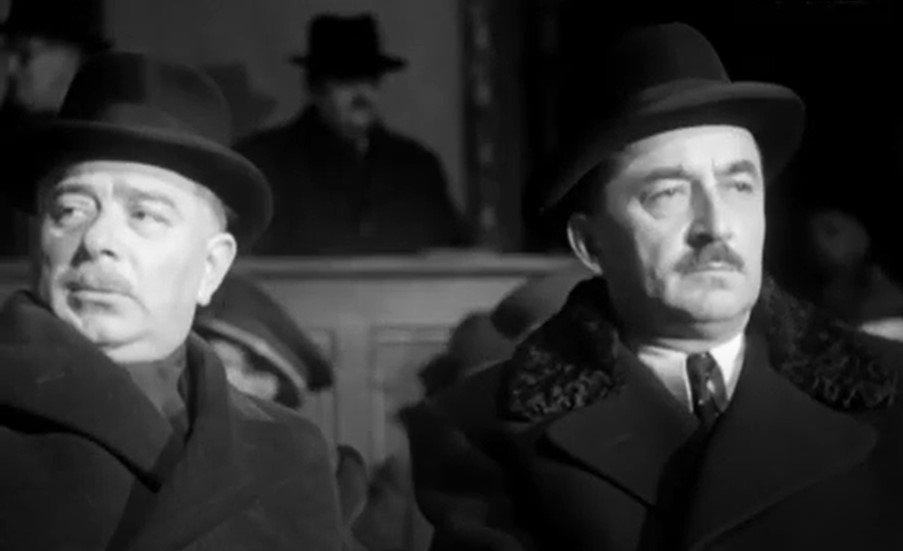
Lajos Stöckler and Prime Minister Ferenc Nagy at commemoration of 2nd Anniversary of the Liberation of the Ghetto – Dohány Street Synagogue 1 March 1947.

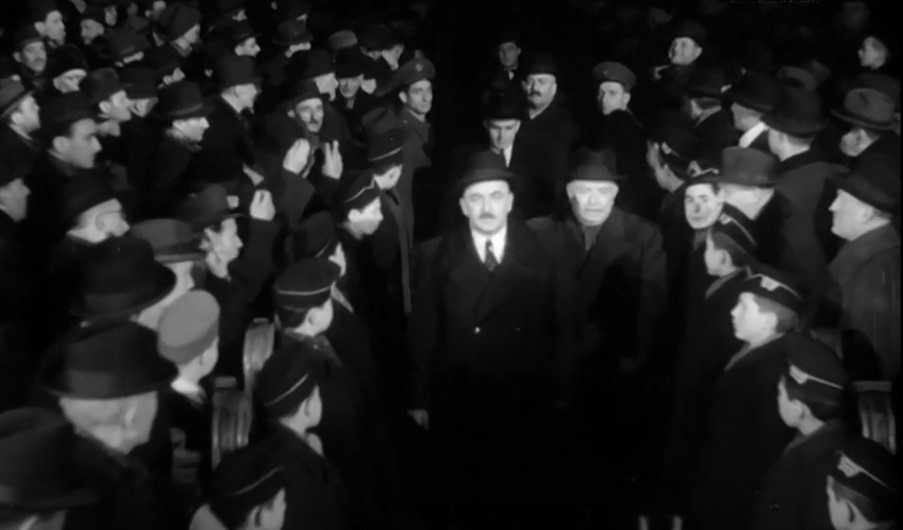
Prime Minister Ferenc Nagy and Lajos Stöckler entering Dohány Street Synagogue 1 March 1947.

On 1 March 1947, the Dohány Street Synagogue was filled with worshippers and officials including Stöckler and Prime Minister Ferenc Nagy for a commemorative service recognising the 2nd anniversary of the ghetto's liberation. Throughout the Spring of 1947 Stöckler began to publish his memoirs as a series of articles titled 'Before the Ghetto – under the Ghetto' in the Hungarian Jewish weekly newspaper Új Élet (New Life). While 7 editions were published, the memoir series abruptly ended without explanation.

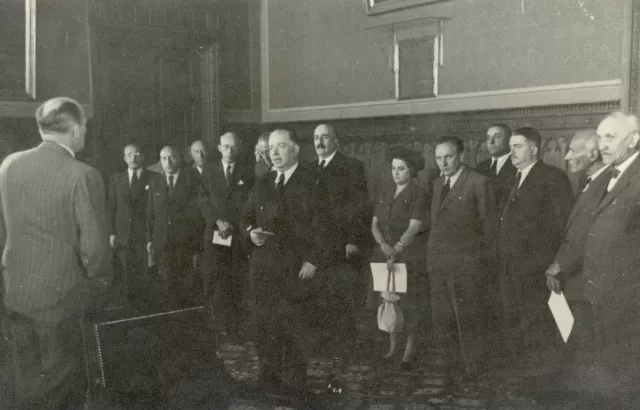
Prime Minister Lajos Dinnyés, awards Lajos Stöckler the Officers Cross Order of Merit of the Republic of Hungary in Parliament. Behind Stöckler with a moustache is Miksa Domonkos. On the other side of the woman next to Domonkos is Dr. Laszlo Benedek head physician. May 1948

In May 1948, Hungarian Prime Minister Lajos Dinnyés, awarded Stöckler the Officer's Cross of the Order of Merit of the Republic of Hungary for his work in saving the Budapest Ghetto.

=== Accusation of Wallenberg's Murder & Show Trials ===
On 16 January 1953, Stöckler was arrested alongside co-accused of Miksa Domonkos and Dr. László Benedek in relation to fabricated charges of allegedly murdering Raoul Wallenberg with Károly Szabó and Pál Szalai as witnesses. All the men were brutally tortured as part interrogations by the State Protection Authority (ÁVH) to extract forced "confessions". The witness' forced confessions detailed how they saw Stöckler in the basement of the American Embassy standing over Wallenberg's dead body with a smoking pistol still in his hand.

Stöckler was tried in a series of show trials by the Budapest Military Court and the Military Supreme Court. While the implausible charge of Raoul Wallenberg's murder and accusations of Nazi collaboration were ultimately abandoned, Stöckler was convicted of foreign currency charges, persistent disloyalty, and unfit to participate in public affairs. He was eventually sentenced to 5.5 years in prison and fifty percent of his assets were confiscated as penalty. He was subjected to torture and deprivation throughout the period of his incarceration across various ÁVH prisons and Kőbánya State Prison until his conditional release in December 1954.

He received a pardon and was officially "liberated" on 16 January 1955. A subsequent retrial was requested by prosecutors and the Supreme Court of the Hungarian People's Republic acquitted Stöckler (and co-accused) of all charges "in the absence of a crime" on 30 November 1956. All previous judgments and punishments were subsequently repealed.

As a condition of his release, he never spoke about the torture or his incarceration, although physically weakened and mentally darkened. Wounds to his body indicated he had spent prolonged periods with his hands and feet shackled. He was also covered in burns and scarring resulting from other torture endured such as electric shock and severe beatings. His injuries were consistent with survivor testimony of his co-accused Dr Benedek & Domonkos. as well as declassified CIA reports regarding Hungarian Political Police Torture Methods.

=== Emigration & Resettlement ===
An extrication was planned and facilitated with significant financial and logistical assistance from international humanitarian relief agencies spanning USA, Europe and Australia including Hebrew Immigrant Aid Society (HIAS), American Jewish Joint Distribution Committee (Joint or AJDC) and the Federation Australian Jewish Welfare Societies (FAJWS). Stöckler, his wife and mother in-law, escaped Hungary and arrived in Vienna on 31 May 1957. They were immediately issued Israeli visas but chose instead to emigrate to Australia, arriving in Sydney in September 1957 to be reunited with both sons. He died shortly thereafter in 1960.

== Awards and recognition ==
- Order of Merit of the Republic of Hungary (1948)
