= Ministry of Internal Affairs III =

1956–1990 Hungarian secret police

- Belügyminisztérium III. Főcsoportfőnökség

Agency overview
- Formed: 1956; 70 years ago
- Preceding agencies: State Protection Authority; Department II (Political Investigation Department), Ministry of Interior (1956–1962)
- Dissolved: January 1990; 36 years ago
- Type: Secret police
- Jurisdiction: Hungary
- Status: Disbanded after 1990
- Parent agency: Ministry of Interior (Hungary)

Department III of the Ministry of Internal Affairs (Hungarian: Belügyminisztérium III. Főcsoportfőnökség), also known as the State Security Department of the Ministry of Interior (Hungarian: Belügyminisztérium Állambiztonsági Szervek), was the secret police of the Hungarian People's Republic after the State Protection Authority (ÁVH) was disbanded in 1956. The MIA III was called the ÁVH as a derogatory name due to the former replacing the latter in the Hungarian Revolution of 1956.

Archived data related to the ÁVH and MIA III are made available through the Historical Archives of the Hungarian State Security.

For the most part, under the goulash Communism system Department III operated with somewhat more restraint than other secret police agencies in the Communist world, and certainly more so than the ÁVH. However, it was still a feared tool of government control.

== History ==
The Ministry of Interior created Department II in order to replace the State Protection Authority in 1956 as the Political Investigation Department, which operated from 1956 to 1962. The department was further reorganized under András Tömpe because of a scandal that involved a Hungarian military officer named Béla Lapusnyik, who sought asylum to the West through Austria in May 1962. From 1962 to 1964, the state security structure was reorganized with the renaming of the department as MIA III.

According to a statement made by János Kenedi on January 1, 1971, the department had 3,975 staff members, with 242 members serving in the III/III Department. The statement also mentioned that around 11,000 to 17,000 MIA III officers were also working in the department.

In 1978, Section 261 of the Hungarian Criminal Code came into effect, providing legal measures against terrorism. In 1979, the department was instructed by the Hungarian Interior Ministry to work with the Rendőrség as terrorism was made a state security task. Department III/II-8 was tasked to take command of sections involved in fighting against terrorism, including Departments III/I, III/II, III/III and III/IV.

In the early 1980s, reorganization of the entire state security apparatus took place as a response to the increasing number of tasks. Department III/I-8 was divided into Department III/II-9 and Department III/II-10. Department III/II-9 was tasked with warrants. Department III/II-10, which was formed from the former sub-departments III/II-8-B and C, was tasked with controlling tourism and terrorism, with counterterrorism being specifically the task of sub-department III/II-10-A. Department III/II-10 also worked with the Action Subsection of the Rendőrség to conduct periodic raids against Turkish and Arabic individuals suspected of terrorism, arresting, expelling, and initiating criminal procedures against them with the aim of forcing them from the country. By 1987, Ministry of the Interior agencies had compiled files on the Organization of International Revolutionaries (OIR), Abu Nidal Organization, Grey Wolves, and Muslim Brotherhood.

Hungarian authorities had mixed relations with terrorist groups in the 1980s. Various international terrorists found temporary refuge or attempted to establish bases of operation in Hungary in the 1970s and 80s, such as Basque, Turkish, Kurdish, Irish, and other groups, though they were surveilled. Some organizations were provided state support, such as T-34 tanks and training given to the Palestinian Liberation Front in 1979, though its leader Muhammad Zaidan was forced out of Hungary after the Achille Lauro hijacking in 1985. Venezuelan terrorist Carlos the Jackal was allowed to operate from headquarters in Budapest during the early half of the 1980s, though state security closely surveilled him under confidential investigation C-79 and attempted to persuade him to leave.

After Radio Free Europe/Radio Liberty's headquarters in Munich was bombed by Carlos on February 21, 1981, and with pressure from the United States, MIA III worked with Czechoslovak and East German intelligence to curb Carlos' activities throughout Eastern Europe and eventually drive him and his group out of Hungary in 1985. MIA III was also involved in removing ANO's Hungarian base in 1986, likely due to pressure from the US, in confidential investigation N-86. The change from state tolerance to intolerance of terrorists during the 1980s was due to politics. As Hungary opened foreign relations with non-communist countries, including Israel, and pressure from the Soviet Union decreased, the threat of terrorism against Hungarians grew, as did the counterterrorism department. In 1989, it collaborated fully with Japanese and South Korean agencies in an investigation of the Japanese Red Army.

In January 1990, the department was disbanded. The Military Intelligence Office and the Military Security Office were the first post-communist intelligence agencies to be created as the successor to MIA III.

== Structure ==
MIA III was organized in the Hungarian Interior Ministry with the following structure:

- Department III/1 (Intelligence)
  - III/I-1: Intelligence against the US and other international organizations
  - III/I-2: Foreign Intelligence
  - III/I-3: Intelligence against West Germany
  - III/I-4: Intelligence against the Vatican, Israel and Church Emigration
  - III/I-5: Scientific and Technical Intelligence
  - III/I-6: Information, Evaluation and Analysis
  - III/I-7: Intelligence against émigré groups
  - III/I-8: Intelligence and employment of illegal residencies
  - III/I-9: Documentation
  - III/I-10: Personal affairs, training and methodology
  - III/I-11: Intelligence against third-party countries
  - III/I-12: Connections, Registration, Finances and other related tasks
  - III/I-13: National Encryption Center, including encryption/decryption operations
  - III/I-X: Organization of operational connection
  - III/I-Y: Security on foreign missions and residencies
- Department III/2 (Counter-Intelligence)
  - III/II-1: Counter-Intelligence against the US and Latin America
  - III/II-2: Counter-Intelligence against Austria and West Germany
  - III/II-3: Counter-Intelligence against NATO and neutral countries
  - III/II-4: Counter-Intelligence against Middle Eastern and Far East Asian countries
  - III/II-5: Cross-border operational measures
  - III/II-6: Protective measures for military industries, transport, communications, authorities and ministries
  - III/II-7: Responses to areas under international cooperation
  - III/II-8: Protective measures for field of tourism and for Hungarians returning with amnesty
  - III/II-9: Analysis, evaluation and information
  - III/II-10: International cooperation and responses in third country
  - III/II-11: News communication, operational records and supplies
- Department III/3 (Internal Reaction & Sabotage)
  - III/III-1: Operates usually together with Department III/I against churches/religious sects, including former priests/monks in émigré groups
    - III/III-1-a: Internal Reaction against the Roman Catholic Church
    - III/III-1-b: Internal Reaction against Roman Catholic Church leaders and institutes
    - III/III-1-c: Internal Reaction against Protestant and other religious groups
  - III/III-2: Preventive measures with young people in universities, colleges, youth clubs, galleries, etc.
    - III/III-2-a: Preventive measures in higher education institutions
    - III/III-2-b: Operations against anti-youth reaction forces
  - III/III-3: Controlling activities against persons deemed dangerous
    - III/III-3-a: Inspection of F files, mostly on former political prisoners
    - III/III-3-b: Checks against flyers and graffiti
  - III/III-4: Countermeasures against opposition groups
    - III/III-4-a: Proceedings against radical opponents
    - III/III-4-b: Surveillance on Hungarian Socialist Workers' Party (HSWP) officials, Trotskyists and pseudo-leftists
    - III/III-4-c: Countermeasurse against national opposition groups
  - III/III-5: Protection of cultural property
    - III/III-5-a: Preventive measures against Hungarian Radio and Television, MTI, MUOSZ and the Writers' Association
    - III/III-5-b: Preventive measures against groups associated with fine arts, music, museums, theaters, circuses, Hungarian Academy of Sciences, film, universities, colleges, homosexuals and demonstrations against the Bős-Nagymaros dam.
  - III/III-6: Prevention operations of hostile propaganda material
  - III/III-7: Reporting service, internal troubleshooting, data warehouse and record keeping
  - III/III-A: Protection operations for HSWP officials
  - III/III-B: Independent analysis, evaluation and information
- Department III/4 (Military Response)
  - III/IV-1: Responsive measures to Central Bodies and forces under General Staff of the Hungarian People's Army and to the Military Areas of the Ministries
  - III/IV-2: Responsive measures to Areas of the Central Bodies of the Ministry of Defense, Armed Forces Headquarters, institutions and subordinate forces
  - III/IV-3: Preventive measures in 5th Army
  - III/IV-4: Preventive measures in air defense
  - III/IV-5: Preventive measures in 3rd Corps
  - III/IV-6: Preventive measures in Hinterland Headquarters
  - III/IV-7: Preventive measures in Border Guard Area
  - III/IV:
    - Coordination subdivision on escaped soldiers and civilian staff, planning and implementation of central control
    - Evaluation, Analysis, Data Processing and Propaganda Department
    - Battlefield preparation subdivision – Intelligence in the expected areas of application of the Hungarian People's Army (Italy, Austria)
    - Organizational, mobilization and news subdivision
- Department III/5 (Technical Operations)
  - III/V-1: Class K Inspections
  - III/V-2: Chemistry, printing technology and document production
  - III/V-3: Maintenance and operation of operational and technical equipment
  - III/V: Independent evaluation, monitoring, expert and economic subdivisions
- Department III/1 (Investigation Division)
  - III/1-A: Counter-espionage
  - III/1-B: Internal Reaction preventive measures
  - III/1-C: Military matters
  - III/1-D: Evaluation, analysis and records
  - III/1-E: Legal opinions and resolution
  - III/1-F: Prison operations and networks
  - III/1-G: Watchkeeping
  - III/2: Operational Monitoring and Environmental Analysis Department
  - III/3: Postal Items Intercepts
  - III/4: Information, Evaluation and International Relations Department (Regular Intercepts)
  - III/5: Radio Response Department
  - III/6: Personnel Department

== Heads ==
- Mátyás László (November 1956 – February 15, 1957)
- Horváth Gyula (February 16, 1957 – February 1958)
- Galambos József (February 13, 1958 – March 15, 1961)
- Németi József (March 15, 1961 – August 15, 1962)
- Galambos József (15 August 1962 – 1966)
- Rácz Sándor (3 December 1966 – 19 November 1970)
- Rácz Pál (20 November 1970 – 31 December 1973)
- Karasz Lajos (1974–1982)
- Földesi Jenő (1 August 1982 – 30 April 1985)
- Harangozó Szilveszter (1 May 1985 – 30 April 1989)
- Pallagi Ferenc (1989–1990)
