= Gerhard Schmidhuber =

German general (1894–1945)

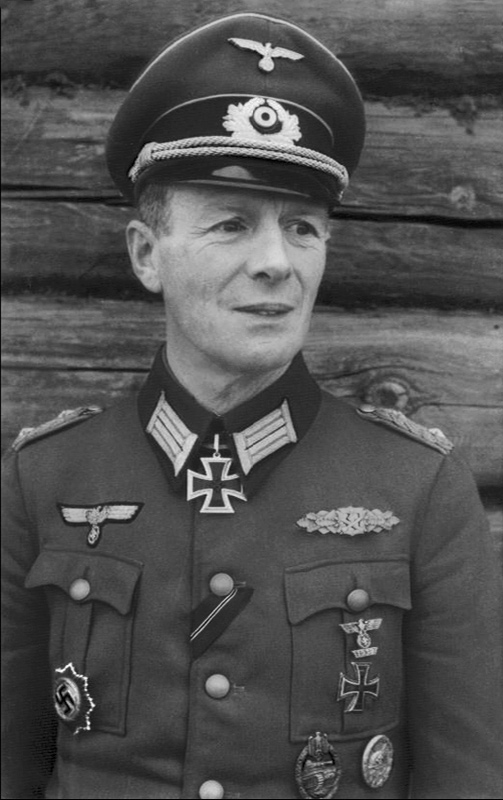
- Born: 9 April 1894; Dresden, Kingdom of Saxony German Empire
- Died: † 11 February 1945 (aged 50); Budapest, Kingdom of Hungary
- Relatives: ∞ 1920 Helen Margaret Baumfelder; 2 sons
- Military career
- Allegiance: German Empire; Weimar Republic; Nazi Germany
- Branch: Royal Saxon Army; Imperial German Army; Reichsheer; German Army
- Service years: 1914–1920; 1933–1945
- Rank: Generalmajor
- Commands: 304th Panzergrenadier Regiment; 13th Panzer Division
- Conflicts: World War I; World War II; Invasion of Poland; Battle of France; Invasion of Yugoslavia; Eastern Front (World War II); Siege of Budapest (KIA)
- Awards: Knight's Cross of the Iron Cross with Oak Leaves
- Other work: Businessman

Gerhard Karl Egon Schmidhuber (9 April 1894 – 11 February 1945) was a German general during World War II.

== Life ==
Schmidhuber was born in Saxony, achieved his Abitur in March 1914 and joined the Royal Saxon 12th Infantry Regiment No. 177 on 1 March 1914 as a one-year volunteer to fulfill his compulsory military service before beginning his studies. Then the First World War broke out, and on 2 August 1914, he was sent to the front. On 26 September 1914, he was wounded near Chevreux during the First Battle of the Aisne (rifle shot to the right shoulder). In September 1915, he was commissioned as a 2nd Lieutenant of the Reserves. He left the army in 1920 and became a businessman, father and eventually took over the factory of his father.

He rejoined in 1933. He had served in both France and in the Soviet Union campaigns as a battalion and regimental commander. On 18 November 1941, he was severely wounded (shot through both jaws) at the Eastern Front. He was a recipient of the Knight's Cross of the Iron Cross with Oak Leaves. Schmidhuber was commanding officer of the 13th Panzer Division during World War II. When the Germans occupied Hungary in 1944, Schmidhuber was supreme commander of German army forces in that country. According to Pál Szalai, he prevented the liquidation of Budapest Jewish ghetto by Hungarian Arrow Cross militias, although his exact role remains disputed.

== Death ==
General Schmidhuber was killed in action in the Battle of Budapest during an escape attempt at the end of the battle.

== Promotions ==
- 1 April 1914 Einjährig-Freiwilliger (one-year volunteer)
- 13 January 1915 Gefreiter (Private E-2/Lance Corporal)
- 14 January 1915 Unteroffizier (NCO/Corporal/Junior Sergeant)
- 18 May 1915 Vizefeldwebel (Vice Sergeant/Vice Staff Sergeant) and appointed officer candidate (Offizieraspirant)
- 8 September 1915 Leutnant der Reserve (2nd Lieutenant of the Reserves)
- 1 October 1933 Leutnant der Reserve a. D. (L)
  - Territorial protection / state security officer (Landesschutz-Offizier)
- 2 March 1934 Oberleutnant a. D. (L) with effect from 1 October 1933 and Rank Seniority (RDA) from 1 April 1930 (1a)
- 16 June 1934 Hauptmann a. D. (L) with effect and RDA from 1 April 1934 (76)
- 15 July 1934 Hauptmann (active Captain) with RDA from 1 December 1933
  - 20 January 1935 received ordinal number (Ordnungsnummer) "11" to his RDA from 1 December 1933
- 31 May 1938 Major with effect and RDA from 1 June 1938 (11)
- 14 June 1941 Oberstleutnant (Lieutenant Colonel) with effect and RDA from 1 July 1941 (6)
- 20 April 1942 Oberst (Colonel) with effect and RDA from 1 April 1942 (145a)
- 1 October 1944 Generalmajor (27a)

== Awards and decorations ==
- Iron Cross (1914), 2nd and 1st Class
  - EK II on 9 May 1915
  - EK I on 7 December 1917
- Saxon Albert Order, Knight 2nd Class with Swords (SA3bX/AR2X) on 16 April 1916
- Wound Badge (1918) in Black on 3 September 1918
- Honour Cross of the World War 1914/1918 with Swords
- Wehrmacht Long Service Award, 4th Class on 2 October 1936
- Repetition Clasp 1939 to the Iron Cross 1914, 2nd and 1st Class
  - Clasp to EK II on 29 September 1939
  - Clasp to EK I on 24 June 1940
- Mentioned in the Roll of Honor of the German Army on 10 October 1941
- Certificate of Recognition of the Commander-in-Chief of the Army on 16 October 1941
- Panzer Battle Badge in Bronze on 10 December 1941
- Wound Badge (1939) in Silver on 7 April 1942
- Winter Battle in the East 1941–42 Medal in August 1942
- Close Combat Clasp in Bronze on 2 November 1943
- Mentioned by name in the supplement to the Wehrmachtbericht on 20 December 1944
- German Cross in Gold on 28 February 1942 as Oberstleutnant and Commander of the II. Battalion//Schützen-Regiment 103
- Knight's Cross of the Iron Cross with Oak Leaves
  - Knight's Cross on 18 October 1943 as Oberst and Commander of Panzergrenadier-Regiment 304
  - Oak Leaves on 21 January 1945 as Generalmajor and Commander of the 13. Panzer-Division

== Sources ==
- German Federal Archives: BArch PERS 6/1863 and PERS 6/300803

Military offices
Preceded by General der Panzertruppe Dr. Karl Mauss	Commander of 7th Panzer Division; 2 May 1944 – 9 September 1944	Succeeded by General der Panzertruppe Dr. Karl Mauss
Preceded by Generalleutnant Hans Tröger	Commander of 13th Panzer Division; 9 September 1944 – 11 February 1945	Succeeded by none
