= Budapest Ghetto =

Nazi ghetto for Jews in Hungary

Coordinates: 47°29′56″N 19°03′52″E

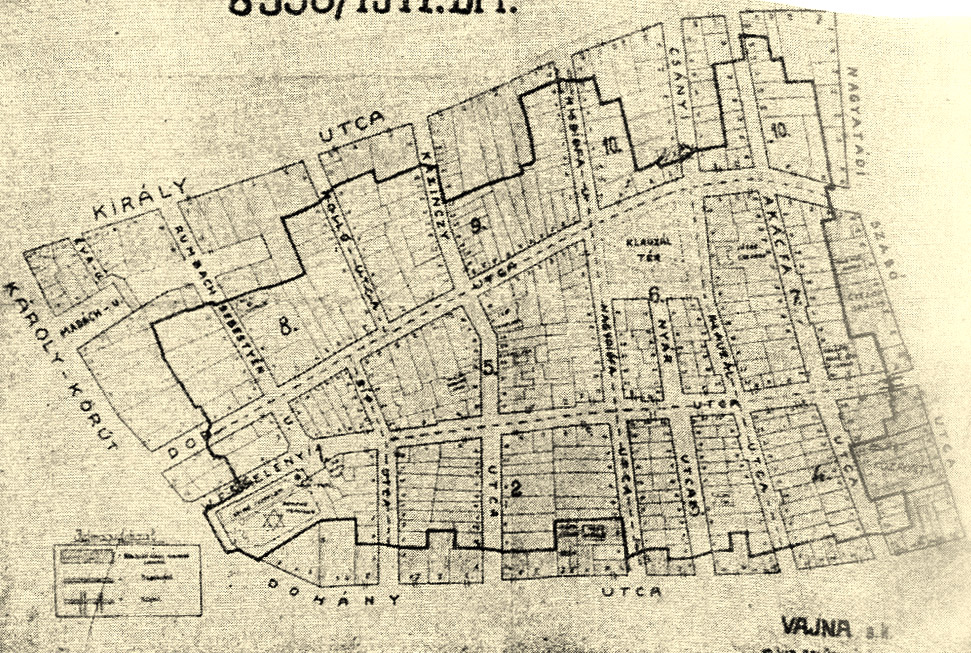
Area of the ghetto by decree of Gábor Vajna (1944)

The Budapest Ghetto was a Nazi ghetto set up in Budapest, Hungary, where Jews were forced to relocate by a decree of the Government of National Unity led by the fascist Arrow Cross Party during the final stages of World War II, as the Soviet army was advancing upon the city. The ghetto existed from November 29, 1944, to January 17, 1945. Thousands of bodies lay in the streets, storefronts, and courtyards when the Soviet army liberated the ghetto on January 18, 1945. Estimates range from 5,000 to 14,300 Jews perished within the walls of the last ghetto to be established by the Nazis in World War II.

== History ==
The area consisted of several blocks of the old Jewish quarter which included the two main synagogues of the city, the Neolog Dohány Street Synagogue and Orthodox Kazinczy Street Synagogue. The ghetto was created on November 29, 1944, by a decree of the Royal Hungarian Government. It was surrounded by a high fence reinforced with planks that was guarded so that contraband could not be sneaked in, and people could not get out. 70,000 Jews were moved into a 0.1 square mile (0,26 square kilometre) zone. The Nazi occupation of Budapest (Operation Margarethe) started on March 19, 1944. The ghetto was established in November 1944, and lasted for less than two months, until the liberation of Budapest on January 17, 1945, by the Soviet Army during the Battle of Budapest.

As with other ghettos that had been set up in other parts of Nazi-occupied Europe, the area was completely cut off from the outside world: no food was allowed in, rubbish and waste were not collected, the dead lay on the streets and were piled up in bombed-out store fronts, and the buildings were overcrowded, leading to the spread of diseases such as typhoid. The inner life of the ghetto was operated by the Central Jewish Council (or Judenrat).

More than half of those that were forced into the ghetto in 1944 were sent to concentration camps, starting almost immediately from the establishment of the ghetto. From the occupation to liberation the Jewish population of Budapest was reduced from 200,000 to 70,000 in the ghetto, and about 20,000 others were housed in specially marked houses outside the ghetto, having been granted diplomatic protection by neutral politicians, including Raoul Wallenberg, who issued Protective Passports on behalf of the Swedish Legation, and Carl Lutz, who did the same via the Swiss Government. Of those that were deported (most of them to a concentration camp on the Austrian border), the vast majority were liberated by the advancing Red Army.

== Saving the ghetto in January 1945 ==
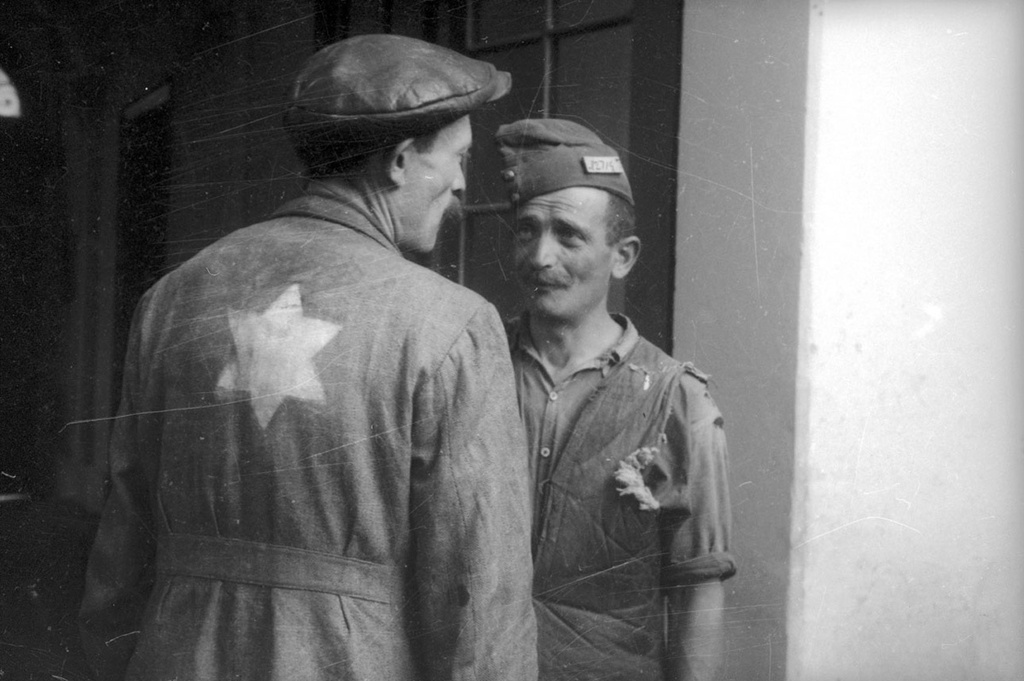
Budapest Ghetto survivors, February 1945, photo by Yevgeny Khaldei

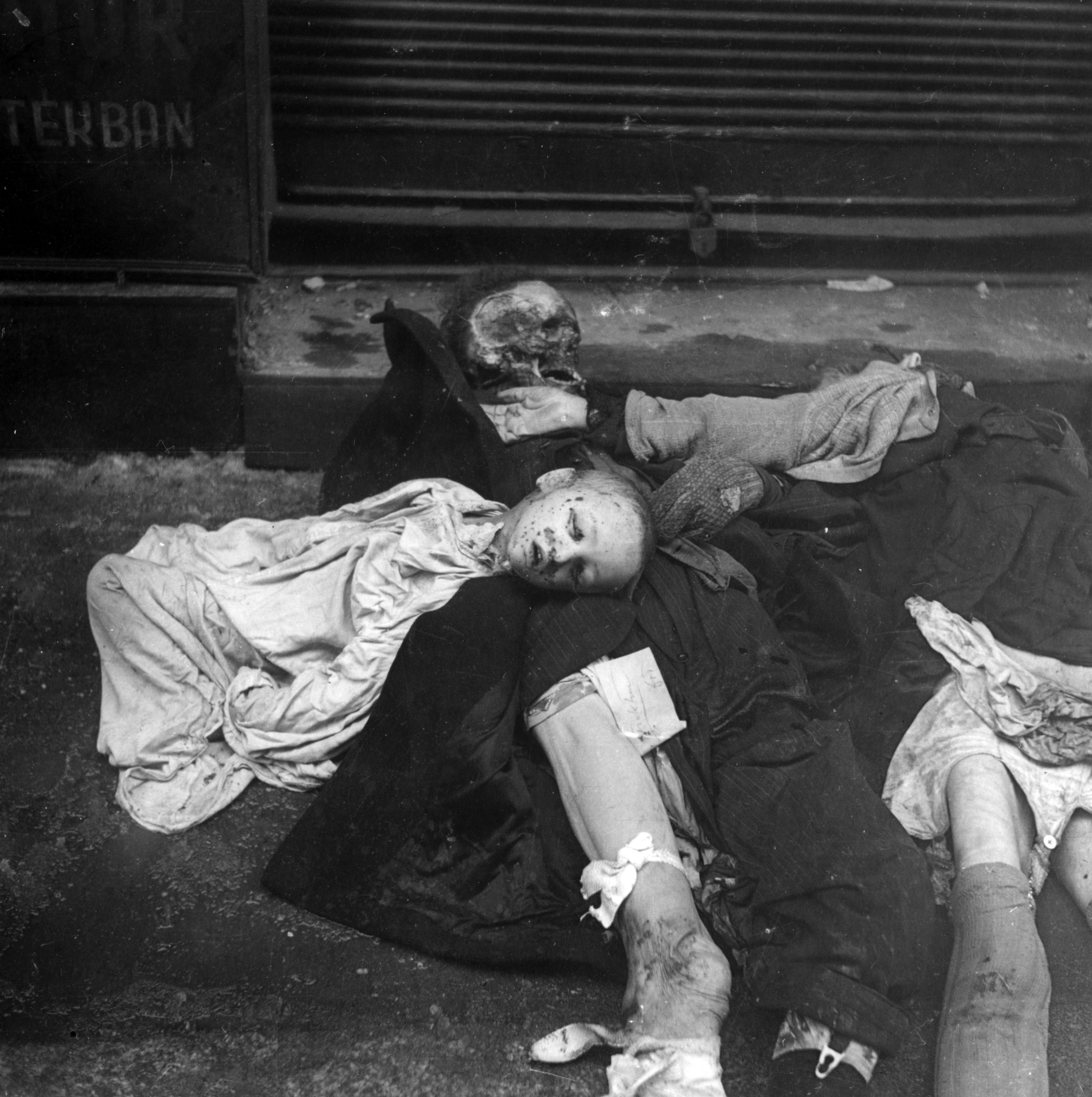
Bodies of Jewish women and a child who died in the Budapest ghetto during the Siege of Budapest, 1945

Károly Szabó, an employee of the Swedish Embassy in Budapest attracted exceptional attention on December 24, 1944, as Hungarian Arrow Cross Party members occupied the Embassy building on Gyopár Street. He rescued 36 kidnapped employees from the ghetto. This action attracted Raoul Wallenberg's interest. He agreed to meet Szabó's influential friend, Pál Szalai, a high-ranking member of the police force. The meeting was on the night of December 26. This meeting was in preparation of saving the Budapest Ghetto in January 1945.

Pál Szalai provided Raoul Wallenberg with special favors and government information. In the second week of January 1945, Raoul Wallenberg found out that Adolf Eichmann planned a massacre of the largest Jewish ghetto in Budapest. The only one who could stop it was the man given the responsibility to carry out the massacre, the commander of the German troops in Hungary, General Gerhard Schmidhuber. Through Szalai, Wallenberg sent Schmidhuber a note promising that he, Raoul Wallenberg, would make sure the general was held personally responsible for the massacre and that he would be hanged as a war criminal when the war was over. The general knew that the war would be over soon and that the Germans were losing. The massacre was stopped at the last minute thanks to the courage and daring action of Wallenberg.

According to Giorgio Perlasca, who posed as the Spanish consul-general to Hungary in the winter of 1944 and saved 5218 Jews, Pál Szalai lied to save his life during his criminal trial, and the history of the saving is different. Raoul Wallenberg (who was already dead at the time of the Szalai's deposition) saved hundreds of people but was not directly involved in the plan to save the ghetto. While Perlasca was posing as the Spanish consul-general, he discovered the intention to burn down the ghetto. Shocked and incredulous, he asked for a direct hearing with the Hungarian interior minister Gábor Vajna, in the basement of the Budapest City Hall where he had his headquarters, and threatened fictitious legal and economic measures against the "3000 Hungarian citizens" (in fact, a much smaller number) declared by Perlasca as residents of Spain, and the same treatment by two Latin American governments, to force the minister to withdraw the project. This actually happened in the following days.

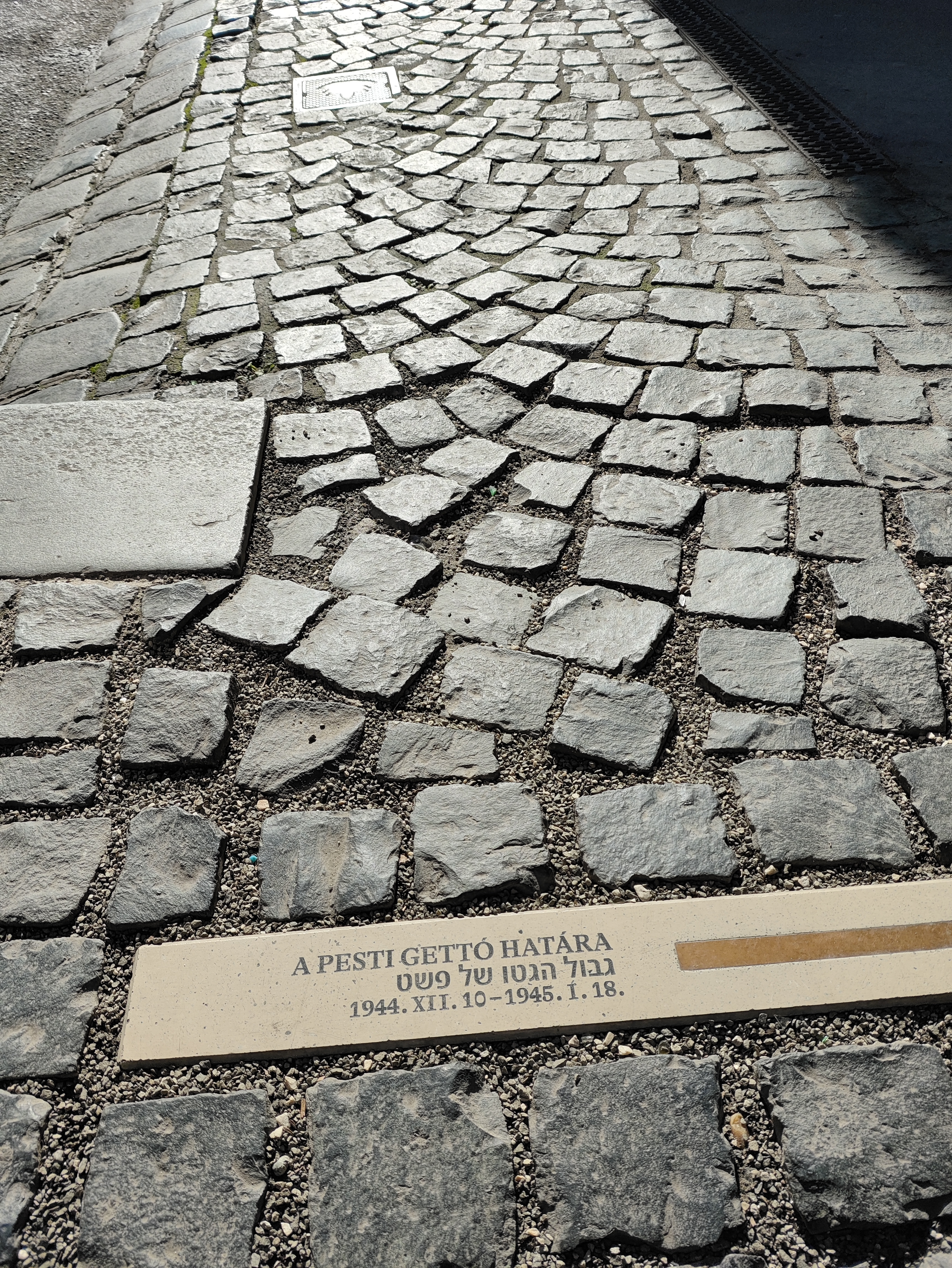
The border of the ghetto of Pest in the Holló street, Budapest

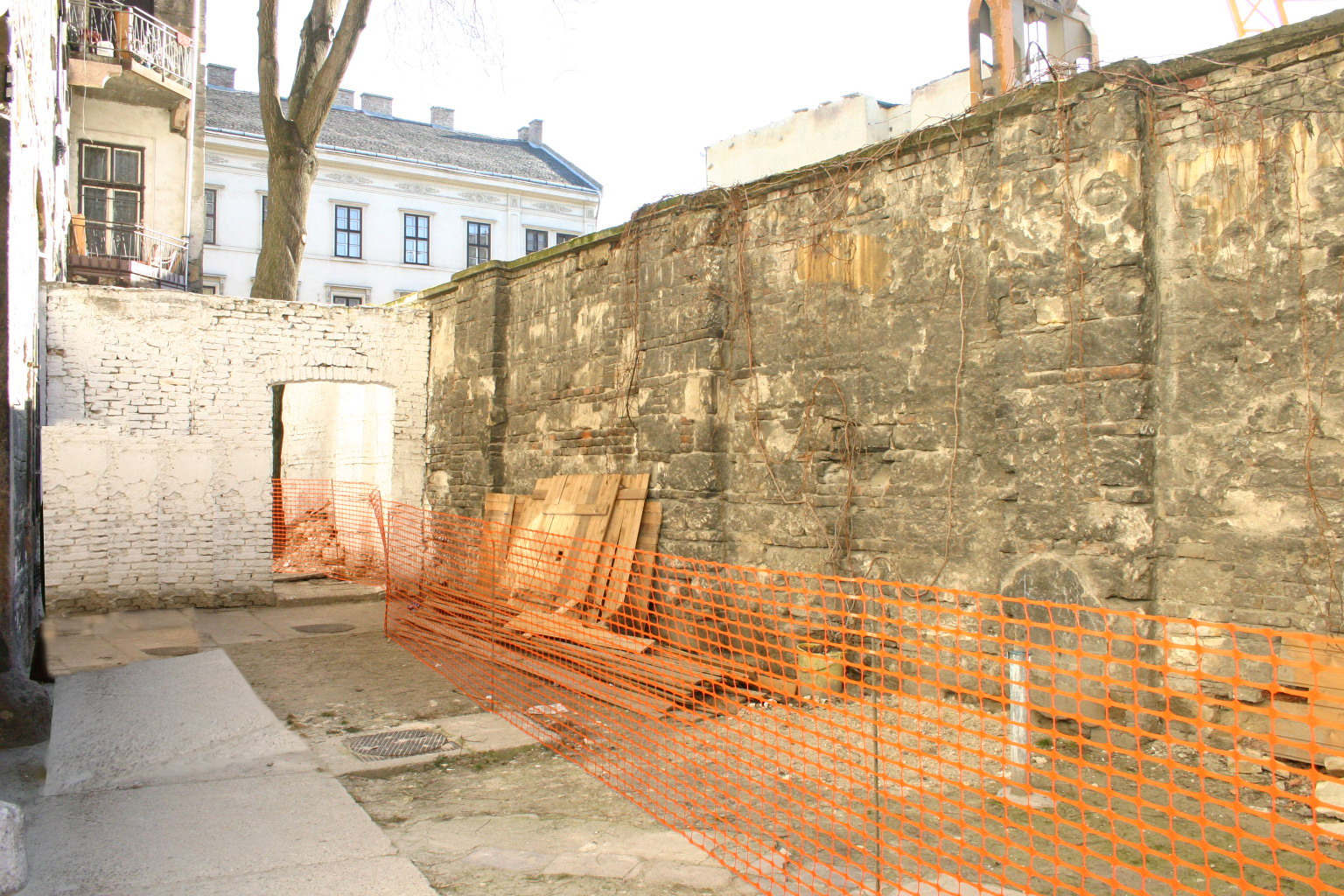
Walls of the ghetto, last section demolished in 2006

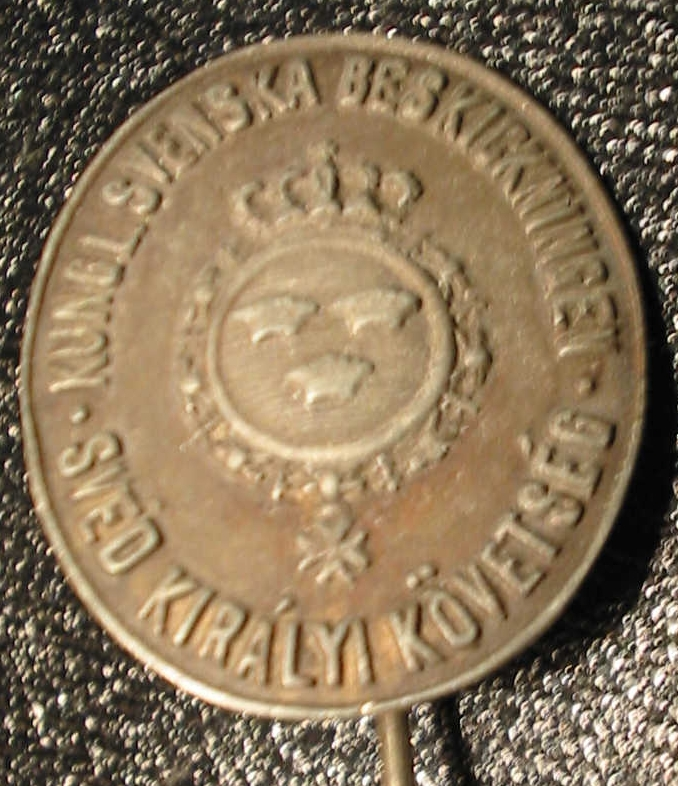
Swedish Legation Budapest 1944 – Badge Karoly Szabo

== Memorial Wall ==
The last remaining section of the ghetto wall was demolished in 2006 during construction work. It was situated in the backyard of a building (No. 15 Király Street) and was originally an old stone wall used by the Nazis in 1944, adding a line of barbed wire. The walls of the ghetto were typically older structures found in the area. A memorial wall was erected on the place in 2008, using some original material, but not matching the exact details. Still, in some areas of the Jewish quarter tiny bits of the wall remain.

== Dohany Street Synagogue ==
In the garden of the Dohany Street Synagogue, 2,282 Jews of 3,099 unburied corpses found within the Budapest Ghetto were buried in a plot of land within the synagogue complex. In addition, the Dohany Street Synagogue houses an exhibition that preserves the history the Budapest Jewish community and the story of this last ghetto of World War II.
