= Otto Fleischmann =

Otto Fleischmann (German: [ˈflaɪʃman]; January 24, 1896, Mór, Austria-Hungary – January 8, 1963, New York City) was a Hungarian-born American psychoanalyst.

== Vienna ==
Otto Fleischmann, although originally a juris doctor, studied philosophy with Moritz Schlick at the University of Vienna and in 1938, became a psychoanalyst under the mentorship of August Aichhorn. Fleischmann was associated with many psychoanalysts including Anna Freud. In 1946, he returned to Vienna from Budapest, to help Aichhorn revive the Vienna Psychoanalytic Society (WPV in German), which had been repressed under Nazi rule. He served as Secretary and Vice President of the WPV until his emigration to the United States to join the faculty of the Menninger Clinic in Topeka, Kansas.

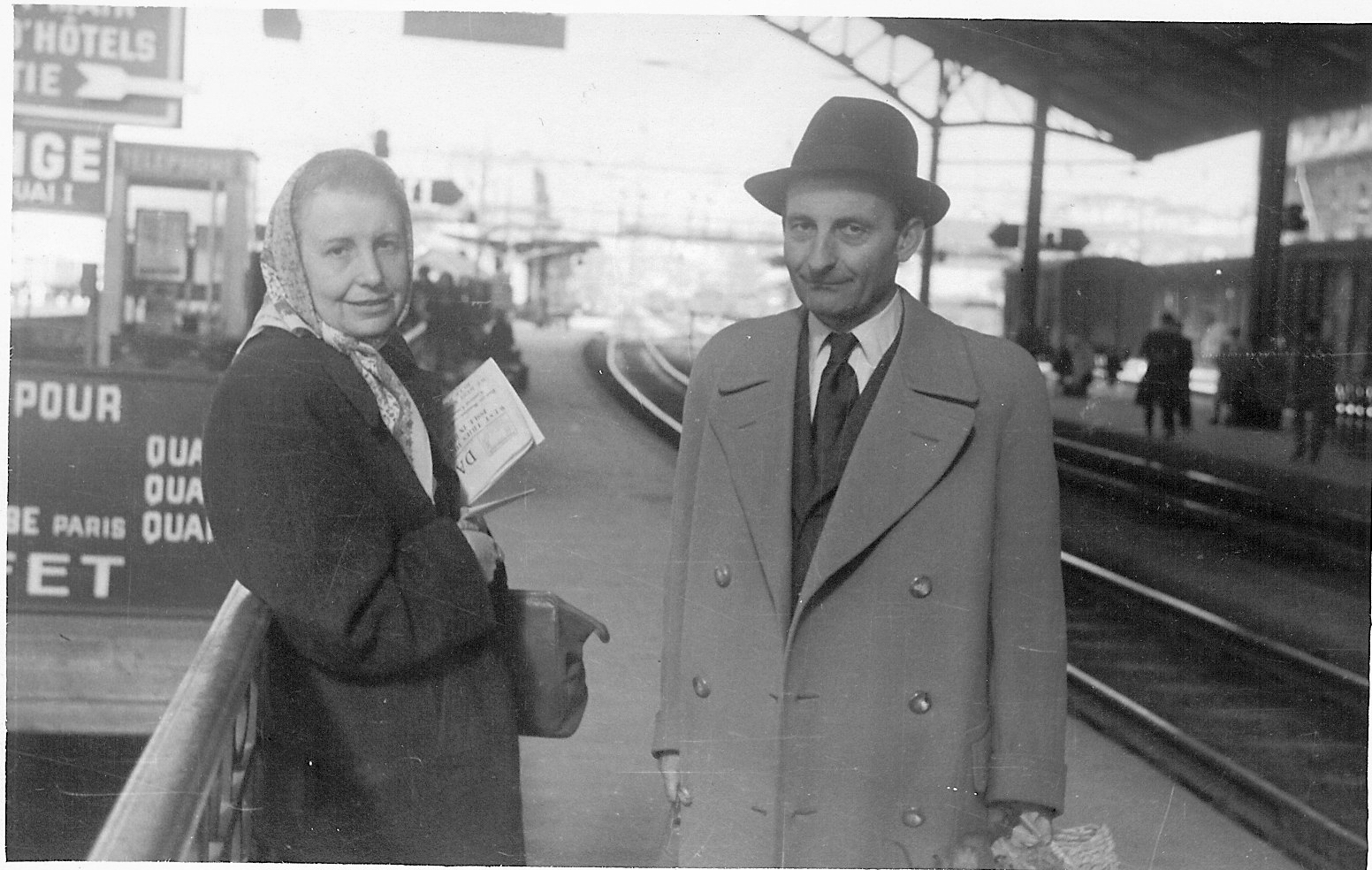
Anna Freud and Otto Fleischmann, Lausanne, Switzerland, 1948

== Budapest, 1938–1946 ==
After the Anschluss, the German Nazi takeover of Austria, Fleischmann went to Budapest, Hungary. In 1944, with the German occupation of Hungary, he received diplomatic protection from the Swedish Foreign Ministry through a Schutzpass provided by Raoul Wallenberg. Fleischmann subsequently worked with Wallenberg in his efforts to save Jews in Hungary, 1944–1945.

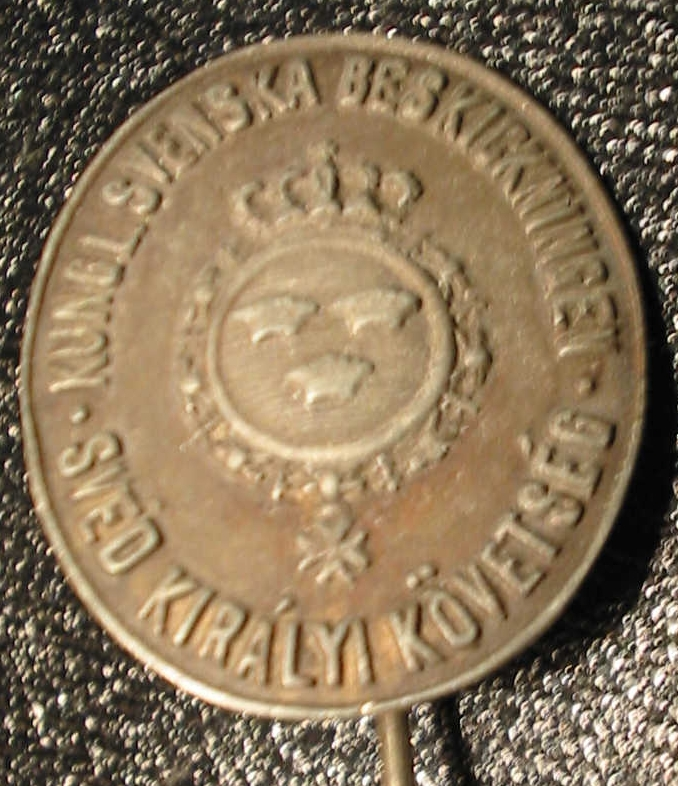
Swedish Legation Budapest 1944 - Badge Karoly Szabo

== Swedish embassy in Budapest ==
Between 1944 and 1945 Károly Szabó was one of the typewriter mechanics of the Swedish embassy. Fleischmann motivated Szabó to play an active role in the rescue actions of Wallenberg. Pál Szalai supported his friend Károly Szabó with important personal documents, signed by the German command in the Battle of Budapest. Otto Fleischmann prepared Károly Szabó psychologically for the rescue actions, and the intuitive decision to purchase a leather coat was another key factor. The black leather trench coat, was a means of inspiring fear and respect, and the subsequent Hollywood image of the black-clad, trench-coated Gestapo officer has entered popular culture. In Budapest's Jewish community Szabó was known as "the mysterious man in the leather coat".

Szabó saved Fleischmann's life in December 1944 (witness in Fleischmann papers, Library of Congress). Szabó was honored as Righteous among the Nations in 2012. Szalai was honored as Righteous among the Nations in 2009.

== Raoul Wallenberg ==
Fleischmann worked with Wallenberg in attempts to protect members of the Hungarian Psychoanalytical community. The last meeting between Raoul Wallenberg and Pal Szalai, together with Fleischmann and Károly Szabó, was on the evening of January 12, 1945 at the Gyopár street Swedish Embassy at Wallenberg's "last supper" invitation. The next day — on January 13 — Wallenberg contacted the Russians to secure food and supplies for the people under his protection. He was detained by the Soviet forces on January 17, 1945.

== Menninger Foundation in the United States ==
In 1949, Fleischmann joined the Menninger Clinic in Topeka, Kansas. On 25 May 1956, Fleischmann was re-elected to serve as director of the institute for the year 1956–57. Fleischmann, head of the psychoanalytic institute was doing psychotherapy behind a one-way vision screen, in full view of all the students. The Clinic became the center of choice for Hollywood stars. Among these were: Judy Garland and Marilyn Monroe.

While at the Menninger Clinic, Fleischmann met and married Dr. Gisela Ebert, a psychiatric resident. Their two children, Esther Fleischmann (b. 1952) and David Fleischmann (b. 1956, deceased) were born in Topeka.
