= John M. Dorsey =

American physician

John Morris Dorsey
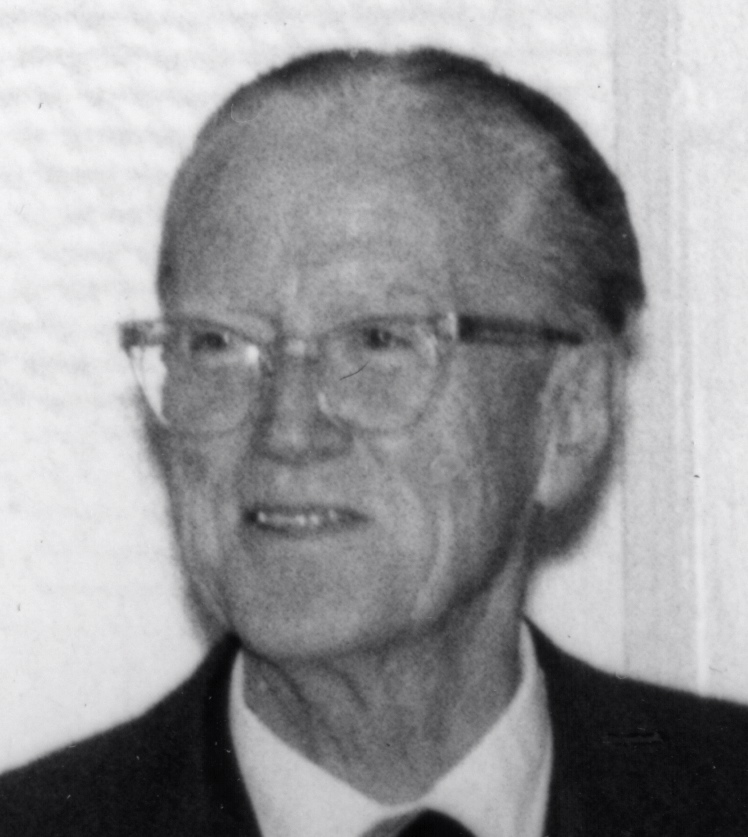
- Born: November 19, 1900; Clinton, Iowa
- Died: August 6, 1978 (aged 77)
- Occupations: Professor of Psychiatry, Wayne State University; author

John Morris Dorsey (November 19, 1900 – August 6, 1978) was an author and professor of psychiatry at Wayne State University.

Born in Clinton, Iowa, Dorsey earned his M.D. from the University of Iowa in 1925. From 1930 to 1935 he taught in the Department of Psychiatry at the University of Michigan in Ann Arbor. In 1935, Dorsey moved with his family to Vienna, Austria, to study under Sigmund Freud, a course of study which included psychoanalysis by Freud personally. In 1940 Dorsey accepted a position as psychiatrist and head of Mental Hygiene Services at Wayne University (later to become Wayne State) in Detroit. In 1946 he was appointed Chairman of Psychiatry. In 1960, Dorsey became the first professor at Wayne State to be honored with the title “University Professor”. A bronze portrait relief by sculptor Marshall Fredericks honoring Dorsey is located on the Wayne State campus. Dorsey continued to teach at Wayne State until his death in 1978.

Dorsey also served as president of the Michigan Society of Neurology and Psychiatry, and the Michigan Association for Psychoanalysis. He wrote more than ten books during his career, including "American Government Conscious Self Sovereignty" (1970), “Psychology of Ethics” (1974), and “An American Psychiatrist in Vienna, 1935-1937, and His Sigmund Freud” (1976).
