= Lars Ernster =

Professor of biochemistry, and a member of the Board of the Nobel Foundation

- Born: Ernster László; 4 May 1920; Hungary
- Died: 4 November 1998 (aged 78)
- Education: Stockholm University
- Known for: Mitochondria and energy transduction
- Scientific career
- Institutions: Wenner-Gren Institute

Lars Ernster (Hungarian: Ernster László; 4 May 1920 – 4 November 1998) was a professor of biochemistry, and a member of the Board of the Nobel Foundation.

== Biography ==
Lars Ernster was born in Hungary and came to Sweden in 1946. He played a prominent role in the scientific community. He took his PhD degree at the Stockholm University in 1956. Until 1967 he was the head of the division for Physiological Chemistry at the Wenner-Gren Institute (Axel Wenner-Gren). From 1967 to 1986 he was a professor of biochemistry. He was a member of the Royal Swedish Academy of Sciences from 1974. He was elected a foreign member of the Royal Netherlands Academy of Arts and Sciences in 1987.

"The burning interest in science, the desire to get to the truth of the matter, the intense but courteous questioning and, above all, his charming and warm smile" as seen by a friend, colleague, fellow-European and competitor Edward Slater. In Mitochondria and Microsomes (C.P. Lee, G. Schatz and G. Dallner, eds.) Addison-Wesley Publishing Co., Reading, MA 1981

== Books ==
- Chemistry and physiology of mitochondria and microsomes, Olov Lindberg, Lars Ernster - Springer (1954) OCLC 1079425
- Protoplasmatologia. Bd. 3. Cytoplasma - Organellen A. Chondriosomen, Mikrosomen, Sphaerosomen.?4. Lindburg, Olov, and Lars Ernster: Chemistry and physiology of mitochondria and microsomes - Springer (1953) OCLC 73859281

== Nobel Foundation ==
- Lars Ernster was a member of the Board of the Nobel Foundation 1977–1988.
- 1978 Presentation Speech by Professor Lars Ernster of the Royal Swedish Academy of Sciences, The Nobel Prize in Chemistry 1978

Your Majesties, Your Royal Highnesses, Ladies and Gentlemen,

The discoveries for which Peter Mitchell has been awarded this year's Nobel Prize for Chemistry relate to a field of biochemistry often referred to in recent years as bioenergetics, which is the study of those chemical processes responsible for supplying energy to living cells.

All living organisms need energy to survive. Muscular work, thought processes, growth, and reproduction are all examples of biological activities that require energy. We know today that every living cell is capable, by means of suitable catalysts, of deriving energy from its environment, converting this energy into a biologically useful chemical form, and utilizing it for various energy-requiring processes.

== Lars Ernster rescued 8 January 1945 ==
During World War II, Lars Ernster, Edith Ernster and Jacob Steiner lived in the office of the Swedish Embassy in Budapest Üllöi ut 2-4. During the night of 8 January 1945, all inhabitants were dragged away by an Arrow Cross Party executing brigade of the city commander near the banks of the Danube. At midnight, 20 policemen with drawn bayonets broke into the Arrow Cross house and rescued everyone.

== Edith Ernster remembers ==
Edith Ernster, who lived through that time, recalls: "It seemed so strange - this country of super-aryans, the Swedes, taking us under their wings. Often, when an Orthodox Jew went by, in his hat, beard and sidelocks, we'd say, 'Look, there goes another Swede."

A special department was created in the Swedish embassy in Budapest with Raoul Wallenberg as its head. It was staffed primarily with Jewish volunteers. Initially, there were 250 workers; later, he had about 400 people working around the clock. Wallenberg seemed to sleep no more than an hour or two a night, and then it was wherever he happened to be working. He was everywhere.

== See also ==
- Memorial: Shoes on the Danube Promenade
- Raoul Wallenberg
- List of Swedish scientists

== Literature ==
- József Szekeres: Saving the Ghettos of Budapest in January 1945, ISBN 963-7323-14-7, Budapest 1997, Publisher: Budapest Archives
- Gábor Forgács: Recollections and Facts; My Days with Raoul Wallenberg (Emlék és Valóság), ISBN 9789630600309, Budapest 2006, in the list of saved persons 8 January. 1945. Lars Ernster rescued to Sweden, around 1970 member of the Board of Nobel Foundation
- The Road to Stockholm. Nobel Prizes, Science and Scientists (Oxford Paperbacks) Istvan Hargittai, Oxford University Press (12. Juli 2005)
- Our Lives: Encounters of a Scientist, Istvan Hargittai, Akademiai Kiado, 30 January 2005
