= Jacob Steiner =

Jacob Steiner (Steiner Erik, Budapest) (1927–2014) was a professor at Hebrew University of Jerusalem, and a researcher of the physiology of the senses.

== Academia ==
He received his Ph.D. from University of Basel in 1964.

He became a lecturer in 1965, a senior lecturer in 1974, an associate professor in 1979 and became emeritus in 1996.

He was a visiting associate professor to the University of Pennsylvania. He was a visiting professor to Brown University. He was a visiting scholar at Monell Chemical Senses Center, in Philadelphia.

== Research interests ==
He did research on the physiology of the senses of taste and smell in man and in animals and their clinical trial. On the behavioral, electrophysiological and autonomous reactions to chemical stimuli. And on the developmental aspects of oral functions.

== Research projects ==
- Behavioral reactions to chemical stimuli (taste and smell) in autistic people.
- Behavioral response to chemical stimuli in man and animals:

"Steiner’s research, which involved infants only a few hours old, clearly shows that humans are born with the capacity to distinguish between various tastes. Jacob E. Steiner, a taste researcher at Hebrew University in Jerusalem, almost all babies, when tasting sweet stimuli, show a ’’marked relaxation of the face, resembling an expression of ’satisfaction.’ ’’ This expression is often followed by a slight smile and even ’’eager licking of the upper lip.’’ When the babies were fed a bitter solution, on the other hand, their facial expressions turned to ’’dislike and disgust or rejection.’’" New York Times April 16.1989. Can Society Tell You What Tastes Good?

"The meticulous observation, semiquantitative analysis and evaluation of behavioral reactions is proposed as one of the most relevant and valid avenues of investigation on the workup of chemosensory stimuli by the living organism. Behavioral manifestations, are probably even in a much easier way "readable" indicators of pleasure and displeasure than any other event-related bodily manifestation. In fact, the phenomenon of bacterial chemotaxis (as usually divided in positive- respectively negative chemotaxis) belong to the same category or kind of innate, probably even inherited reflectory mechanisms expressing " acceptance" - 'indifference' and 'aversion' of the organism." Jacob E. Steiner

== Publications ==
- Taste-acceptance and taste aversion reflected by behavioral 1997
- Taste and smell in familial dysautonomia 1997
- Specific androstenone-anosmia in patients with impaired sperm 1996
- Taste-induced facial expressions in apes and humans 1995
- Book review: Pleasure: The Politics and The Reality 1995
- Behavioral responses to tastes and odors in man and animals. 1994
- Behavior manifestations indicative of hedonics and intensity in 1994
- Taste and odor: Reactivity in depressive disorders: A 1993
- Taste- and odor-reactivity in elderly demented patients 1992
- Olfactory perception of androstenone is related to male 1992
- Behavioral reactions to gustatory stimuli in young chicks 1990
- Analysis of betaine-induced feeding behavior in the Prawn 1990
- Sensory experience induced by nitrous oxide analgesia 1990

== Rescued 1945 ==
Lars Ernster, Edith Ernster and Jacob Steiner lived during World War II in the office of the Swedish Embassy in Budapest Üllöi ut 2–4. Initially, there were 250 workers; later about 400 people working around the clock (Edith Ernster remembers Raoul Wallenberg). During the night of 8 January 1945, all inhabitants were dragged away by an Arrow Cross Party executing brigade of the city commandership near to the Danube banks. At midnight, twenty policemen with drawn bayonets broke into the Arrow Cross house and rescued everyone. Among the saved persons, Lars Ernster returned to Sweden and Jacob Steiner went to Israel. Lars Ernster was a member of the Board of the Nobel Foundation from 1977 to 1988. Jacob Steiner is a professor at the Hebrew University of Jerusalem.

Information from Jacob Steiner after he has read this page: On December 25, 1944, Jacob Steiner's father was shot dead by Arrow Cross militiamen, falling into the Danube as a result. His father had been an officer in World War I and spent four years as a prisoner of war in Russia.

Memorial: Shoes on the Danube Promenade

== See also ==
- Clinical neurophysiology
- Shoes on the Danube Promenade

== Sources ==
- The New York Times, April 16 1989, "Can Society Tell You What Tastes Good?"
- Hebrew University of Jerusalem
