= Pál Szalai =

- Born: September 3, 1915; Budapest, Hungary
- Died: January 16, 1994 (aged 78); Los Angeles, California, US
- Occupation: Police officer
- Known for: Rescuing Hungarian Jews from the Holocaust

Pál Szalai (September 3, 1915 – January 16, 1994) also spelled Pál Szalay and later anglicized as Paul Sterling was a high-ranking Hungarian police officer and a member of the Arrow Cross Party. In 1945, together with Swedish diplomat Raoul Wallenberg, Szalai helped save hundreds of Hungarian Jews in the Budapest ghetto.

In 2009, he was honored by Israel as Righteous among the Nations.

== Biography ==
Pál Szalay was born in Budapest on 3 September 1915.

=== The Wallenberg-Szalai connection ===
In the Hungarian Boy Scouts in 1929 Szalay became friends with Károly Szabó. This friendship continued in the critical months 1944 - 1945 while Pál Szalai, high-ranking member of the police force supported Raoul Wallenberg.

Szalai was from 1939 to 1942 an idealistic member of the Arrow Cross Party. He left the party in 1942 disillusioned, and returned to a high-ranking police force position in October 1944 to help people in mortal danger from the Holocaust.

Szalai's friend Károly Szabó was an employee of the Swedish Embassy. Dr. Otto Fleischmann Doctor of Medicine and psychologist of the Swedish Embassy motivated Károly Szabó to play active role in the rescue actions of Raoul Wallenberg. Pál Szalai supported his friend with important personal documents, signed from the German command in the Battle of Budapest. Szalai agreed to meet Raoul Wallenberg at the Swedish Embassy in the night of December 26, 1944.

=== The ghetto in Budapest ===
Szalai provided Raoul Wallenberg with special favors and government information. In the second week of January 1945, Raoul found out that Adolf Eichmann planned a massacre in the Budapest ghetto. The only one who could stop it was the man given the responsibility to carry the massacre out, the commander of the German troops in Hungary, Major General Gerhard Schmidhuber. Through Szalai, Wallenberg sent Schmidhuber a note promising that he, Raoul Wallenberg, would make sure the general was held personally responsible for the massacre and that he would be hanged as a war criminal when the war was over. The general knew that the war would be over soon and that the Germans were losing. The massacre never took place.

According to Giorgio Perlasca, who posed as the Spanish consul-general to Hungary in the winter of 1944 and saved 5218 Jews, Pál Szalai lied to save his life during his criminal trial, and the history of the saving is different. Raoul Wallenberg saved hundreds of people but was not directly involved in the plan to save the ghetto. While Perlasca was posing as the Spanish consul-general, he learned of the intention to burn down the ghetto. Shocked and incredulous, he asked for a direct hearing with the Hungarian interior minister Gábor Vajna, in the basement of the Budapest City Hall where he had his headquarter, and threatened fictitious legal and economic measures against the "3000 Hungarian citizens" (in fact, a much smaller number) declared by Perlasca as residents of Spain, and the same treatment by two Latin American governments, to force the minister to withdraw the project. This actually happened in the following days.

=== After the war ===
After the war, Szalai was one of few high-ranking members of the Arrow Cross Party not executed. He was set free in recognition of his cooperation with Wallenberg.

=== Show trial preparations 1953 in Hungary ===
Preparations for a show trial started 1953 in Budapest to "prove" that Wallenberg had never been in the Soviet Union, nobody had dragged off Wallenberg in 1945, least of all the Soviet Army. Everything was ready for a trial designed to prove that Wallenberg had been the victim of cosmopolitan Zionists. Three leaders of the Jewish community of Budapest and former officials of the Central Jewish Council, Dr. László Benedek, Lajos Stöckler, and Miksa Domonkos, as well as two additional "eyewitnesses" Pál Szalai and Károly Szabó were arrested and tortured. The witness' forced confessions detailed how they saw Stöckler in the basement of the American Embassy standing over Wallenberg's dead body with a smoking pistol still in his hand.

The preparations for the show trial were initiated in Moscow, as part of Joseph Stalin's increasing antisemitic and anti-Zionist campaign - e.g. Solomon Mikhoels murder, Night of the Murdered Poets (of the World War II time Jewish Anti-Fascist Committee), Slansky Trial, Doctors' Plot. After Stalin's death on March 5, 1953, and as Lavrentiy Beria was executed, the trial was aborted and the arrestees released in fall 1953. Due to severe torture Miksa Domonkos died shortly after being released while Lajos Stöckler was convicted of foreign currency charges, persistent disloyalty, and unfit to participate in public affairs. Stöckler was sentenced to 5.5 years in prison and fifty percent of his assets were confiscated as penalty. Although conditionally released in late 1954 and later pardoned in 1956 he had become psychologically impaired and died in 1960.

=== Emigration and death ===
Szalai emigrated in 1956 to the United States and lived in New Jersey, then moved to California. He died on January 16, 1994, in Los Angeles, California, under the name "Paul Sterling".

== See also ==
- Károly Szabó
- Lajos Stöckler
- popular Hungarian actor Kálmán Rózsahegyi
