= Arrow Cross =

Graphic symbol

An Arrow Cross, or Cross Barby

Arrow Cross Party insignia

Flag of Falange Venezolana

A cross whose arms end in arrowheads is called a "cross barby" or "cross barbée" in the traditional terminology of heraldry. In Christian use, the ends of this cross resemble the barbs of fish hooks, or fish spears.

In modern use, the symbol has become associated with extremist organisations after the Arrow Cross (Nyilaskereszt) symbol was used in Hungary in the 1930s and 1940s as the symbol of a far-right Hungarist fascist political party, the Arrow Cross Party, led by Ferenc Szálasi, and of this party's thuggish paramilitary organization. The symbol consists of two green double-ended arrows in a cross configuration on a white circular background on a red background. The arrow cross symbol remains outlawed in Hungary.

A variant symbol, the Crosstar—is used by the Nationalist Movement, a white supremacist group based in the United States.

A similar symbol, a modified version of the Portuguese Cross (with inverted triangular edges), was used by the former Brazilian Patrianovist Imperial Action organization from 1928 to 1937.

The arrow cross was previously used by the Falange Venezolana (Venezuelan Phalanx), a far-right group based in Venezuela.

== See also ==
- Greek cross
- Arrow (symbol)
- The Six Arrows
- Three Arrows
- Symbol of Chaos
