= Munk =

Munk is a surname. Notable people with the surname include:

- Munk (born 1965), alias of Estonian actor and singer Ivo Uukkivi
- Alena Munkova (1926-2008), Czech writer who worked in Staflik a Spagetka
- Anders Munk (1922–1989), Danish mycologist
- Andrzej Munk (1920–1961), Polish film director
- Eduard Munk (1803–1871), German philologist
- Elie Munk (1900–1981), German-born French rabbi and rabbinic scholar
- Hermann Munk (1839–1912), German physiologist
- Jens Munk (1579–1628), Danish-Norwegian explorer of the Arctic
- Jiri Munk (born TBA), Czech writer and Alena's brother
- József Munk (b. 1890), Hungarian Olympic medalist swimmer
- Kaj Munk (1898–1944), Danish playwright
- Kirsten Munk (1598–1658), morganatic wife of Christian IV of Denmark-Norway
- Ludvig Munk (1537–1602), Governor-general of Norway from 1577 to 1583
- Marc-David Munk (born 1973), Physician and executive
- Marie Munk (1885-1978), German-American lawyer, first female judge in Germany
- Max Munk (1890–1986), NASA, aerodynamics, Variable-Density Wind tunnel 1921
- Nina Munk (born 1967), American journalist and non-fiction writer
- Paneeraq Siegstad Munk (born 1977), Lutheran bishop in Greenland
- Peter Munk (1927–2018), Canadian businessman and philanthropist
- Salomon Munk (1803–1867), German-born Jewish-French Orientalist
- Walter Heinrich Munk (1917–2019), American oceanographer
- William Munk (1816–1898) English physician, compiler of Munk's Roll

== See also ==
- Munk (disambiguation)
