= Munk (disambiguation) =

Munk is a surname.

Munk may also refer to:

- Munk, Kentucky
- Münk, Germany
- Chipmunk
- Munk School of Global Affairs & Public Policy at the University of Toronto

== See also ==
- Munch (disambiguation)
- Monk (disambiguation)
- Munak (disambiguation)
