= Miklós Szegő =

Jewish council member in Hungary

- Born: Menachem Schützer; 1884; Mór, Austria-Hungary
- Died: January 4, 1945 (aged 60–61); Budapest, Hungary
- Cause of death: murdered by fascist militia
- Known for: member of the Jewish Council of Budapest
- Spouse: Róza Bernstein

Miklós Szegő (born Menachem Schützer; 1884 – 4 or 6 January 1945) was a Hungarian Jewish jurist during the World War II. Following the German invasion of Hungary, he took part in organizing Jewish councils in Central Hungary. As a member of the Jewish Council of Budapest at the last stage of the war, he was arrested and executed by Arrow Cross Party militia in the midst of the siege of Budapest.

== Professional career ==
Miklós Szegő was born as Menachem Schützer in 1884 in Mór, Fejér County, as the son of Jakab Schützer and Róza Grünfeld. Other sources place his birth year at 1887. He had a brother Béla, a wealthy soap maker. He obtained a law degree in Budapest. He opened his law firm in Székesfehérvár in 1910. He was a member of the bar association and its board until 1937. Among others, he was a legal representative of far-right politicians Sándor Festetics and Domonkos Festetics. Simultaneously, he also became a member of a legislative authority of Székesfehérvár and the directorate of the Székesfehérvár and Fejér County Savings Bank. He was involved in the Israelite Hungarian Literary Society too. He served as vice president of the Neolog Székesfehérvár Israelite Congregation from 1929, then he presided the community from 1939. Szegő and his wife Róza Bernstein supported Zionism in their residence.

In the 1930s, he farmed his 12,000-acre estate in Fejér and Veszprém counties. By 1942, his estate became the largest milk supplier to Székesfehérvár. However, the anti-Semitic provisions hindered its operation. For instance, in 1939, he was fined 2,400 pengős for employing more than the permitted number of Jews on his estates.

== During the Holocaust ==
The Nazi Germany invaded Hungary on 19 March 1944. They immediately established the Central Jewish Council seated in Budapest. Szegő was among those rural Jewish leaders, who attended the first official meeting of the council on 28 March, after granting domestic travel permit from the German administration. Jewish councils were created throughout the country in the following weeks. Szegő, as head of the local Neolog community, automatically was installed as president of the Jewish Council of Székesfehérvár, despite that he allegedly stated that "leading a Jewish council is synonymous with death. If you obey the Germans, you might survive, but the Jews will be killed by the end of the war. But if you follow your Jewish sense of self, the Nazis will kill you". Furthermore, Szegő, leading a regional Jewish council also headquartered in Székesfehérvár, was mandated to abolish the religious communities throughout the region, in Fejér and Veszprém counties. In their places, Szegő organized and installed Jewish councils with the mandate given by SS officials, for instance, in Bicske, Felcsút, Győrszentmárton, Sárbogárd, Sárkeresztúr and Szabadhídvég.

Szegő was taken into custody sometime before 12 April 1944 by Gestapo. He was incarcerated in a detention house in Budapest. He was held in captivity still on 7 May. He was released in the next days, he took over his tasks again on 12 May. Shortly after, he was again arrested and was lying in the prisoners' hospital on Mosonyi Street. Together with his community, Szegő was interned to the collection camp of Székesfehérvár before their deportation. However, Szegő and his family, as noted Zionists, were freed and transported to Budapest as part of the Kastner operation on 14 June 1944. Thereafter, Szegő found refuge at Glass House. Following the Arrow Cross Party coup on 16 October 1944, Szegő was appointed a member of the Central Jewish Council and in this capacity, he was active in the Budapest Ghetto amidst the siege of Budapest in December 1944. He mainly dealt with matters of food, medicine and cleanliness. He intended to establish patient rooms per house, organized childcare and epidemic hospital, but there was no time or opportunity for that. Szegő was abducted and murdered by Arrow Cross Party militia on 4 or 6 January 1945, few days before the Soviets liberated the Budapest Ghetto.

== Sources ==
- Munkácsi, Ernő (2018). Munk, Nina (ed.). How It Happened: Documenting the Tragedy of Hungarian Jewry. McGill–Queen's University Press. ISBN 978-0-77-355512-9.
- Veszprémy, László Bernát (2021). "Kik vezették a vidéki zsidó tanácsokat? [Who led the rural Jewish councils?]". Múlt és Jövő (Új folyam) (in Hungarian). 32 (1): 101–117. ISSN 0864-8646.
- Veszprémy, László Bernát (2023). Tanácstalanság. A zsidó vezetés Magyarországon és a holokauszt, 1944–1945 [Bereft of Council. Jewish leadership in Hungary during the Holocaust in 1944–1945] (in Hungarian). Budapest: Jaffa Kiadó. ISBN 978-963-475-731-3.
