= Béla Berend =

Hungarian rabbi and Jewish council member

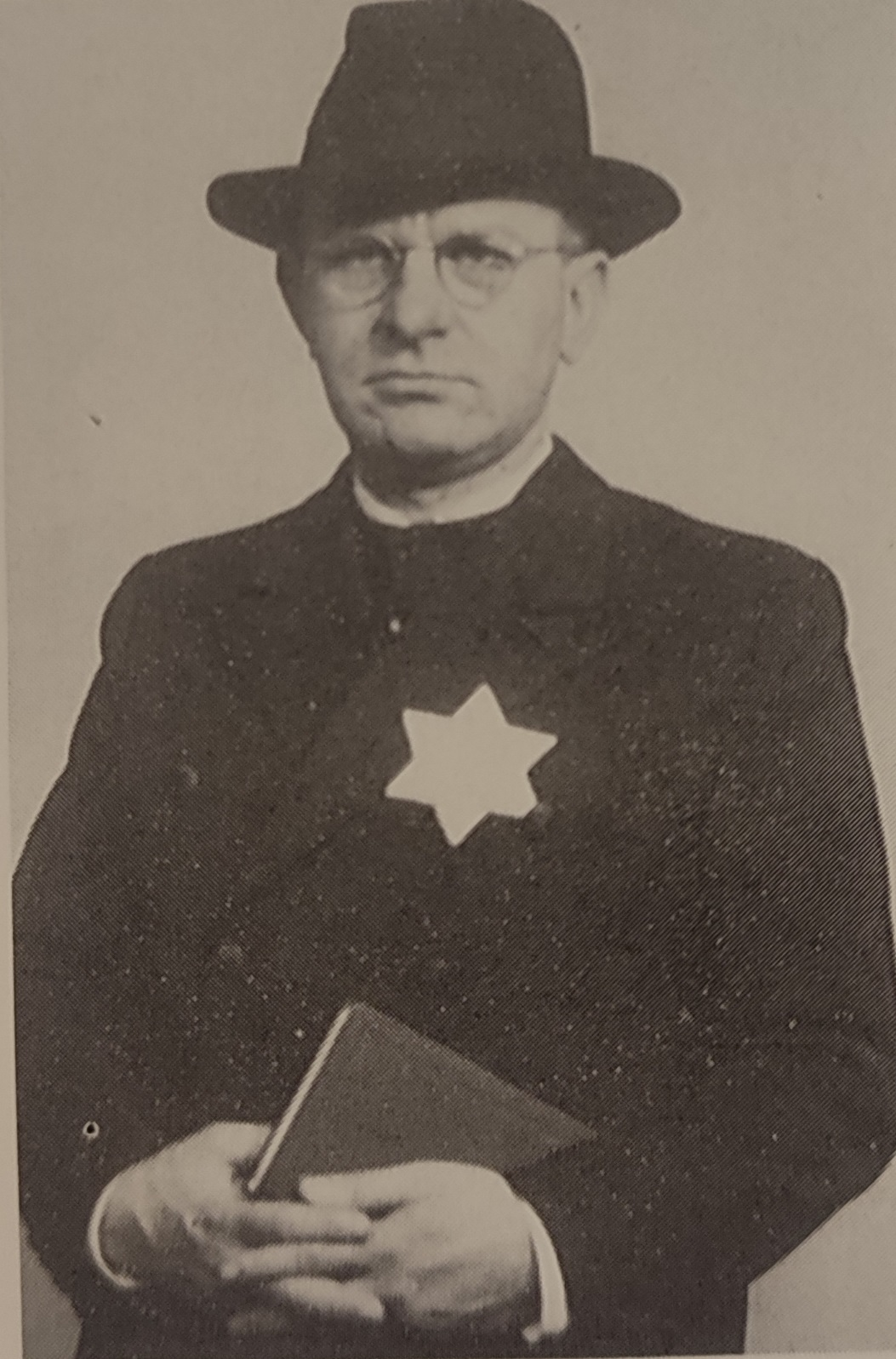
- Béla Berend as rabbi of the Budapest Ghetto in 1944
- Born: Béla Presser; January 12, 1911; Budapest, Austria-Hungary
- Died: June 24, 1987 (aged 76); New York City, United States
- Other name: Albert Bruce Belton
- Known for: accused of collaboration with Nazi Germany
- Spouse(s): 1, unknown 2, Ilona Windt

Béla Berend (born Presser; 12 January 1911 – 24 June 1987) was a Hungarian Jewish rabbi and right-wing Zionist leader during the World War II and the Holocaust. As a controversial member of the Jewish Council of Budapest (or Judenrat), he was accused of collaboration with Nazi Germany during a Communist show trial following the war, but he was acquitted. He emigrated to the United States and took the name Albert Bruce Belton. His personality and activity remain the subject of much debate among historians.

== Early life ==
Béla Presser was born as an eighth child as the son of Adolf Presser and Regina Máriás, into a poor Orthodox Jewish family in Budapest, Austria-Hungary on 12 January 1911. His father, a Talmud, Tanakh and Shulchan Aruch scholar, held the honorary title of Talmid Chakham.

Presser attended the rabbinical seminary of Budapest from 1925 to 1930. Thereafter, he studied at the Jewish Theological Seminary of Breslau between 1930 and 1931. Returning Hungary, he continued his studies in rabbinical seminary and simultaneously also attended the department of philosophy at the Royal Hungarian Pázmány Péter University. In the latter university, he earned a Doctor of Philosophy degree in 1934. He was ordained a rabbi in 1936. He changed his last name from Presser to Berend in 1937.

== Pre-occupation activities ==
Berend was elected Neolog Chief Rabbi of Szigetvár in Somogy County in January 1937. The town had a population of approximately 300 Jews, but the communities of the 12 surrounding settlements also belonged to Berend's jurisdiction. Berend felt that this appointment was inferior, but "he had no choice". In his biography, Berend claimed that he had many difficulties in this position because he, a poor Zionist, was confronted with a community of rich assimilants, who were loyal to the right-wing rule of Regent Miklós Horthy. Nevertheless, Berend was also a vocal supporter of the regent. In one of his speeches in 1940, commemorating the 20th anniversary of Horthy's election as regent, he exhorted his followers to patriotism and honor Miklós Horthy. His contemporaries described Berend as "idealistic", "impetuous" and somewhat "compulsive nonconformist". Ernő Munkácsi, secretary-general of the Central Jewish Council called him "revolutionary, anti-assimilant and anti-capitalist". József Katona, the rabbi of Dohány Street Synagogue testified during the trial that Berend was a "hard-working, talented, [but] almost careerist person who is too agitated".

In his later biography, Berend claimed that while he was socially sensitive, the local Neolog elite did not financially support the local Jewish labor servicemen. However, contemporary documents (bills, accounting) do not support this, the local elite donated substantial sums to the religious community to buy food and clothing for the workers. Berend himself was also recruited into labour service at least from 1940. In that year, he sent a complaint to the Ministry of Defence in which he spoke against the alleged preferential treatment of the rich converted Jews within the labour service system. The confrontation between the rabbi and prominent members of the congregation in Szigetvár escalated to such an extent that the latter tried to remove Berend from his position. The payment of Berend's service allowance was refused all along, for seven years.

Berend gradually turned to Zionism in the early 1940s. In this capacity, he also established contacts with notorious anti-Semitic persons, as he believed this approach is able to "transform their passionate hatred of Jews by supporting the Zionist goals of the Jewish nation, as it would actually serve the interests of both sides: those of the unwanted "redundant" Jews and those of the host nations". Berend considered that the Aliyah satisfies the anti-Semitic objective, thus the Final Solution (i.e. extermination of Jews) can be avoided. Berend joined the right-wing Zionist organization Jewish Work Community (Hungarian: Zsidó Munkaközösség). In this capacity, he contacted with far-right and anti-Semitic figures such Domonkos Festetics, the Member of Parliament for Szigetvár, and Zoltán Bosnyák, director of the Jewish Question Institute. He was also involved in the Betar movement. During a meeting in 1941, its participants, including Berend, decided to contact leading far-right politicians and lawmakers in an effort to "Zionize" them. During this process, a close working relationship developed between Berend and Bosnyák since 1942.

== During the Holocaust ==
=== During the deportations ===
Germany invaded and occupied Hungary on 19 March 1944, establishing a Nazi-puppet government in the country. Days after the invasion, Berend sent numerous letters to Bosnyák and Secretary of State for Interior László Endre, a leading figure of the deportations, in which he propagated the emigration of Jews to Palestine. In his letters, dated in April and May 1944, Berend claimed that he intended to create a Jewish council whose operation would be legitimized by the Hungarian authorities and not under the control of the Gestapo, in the form in which it was established the day after the invasion, under the leadership of Samu Stern. Berend did not receive an answer to his drafts. Bosnyák forwarded the document for study and assured Berend that he would also be included in a new council as a representative of rural Jews. According to the draft written by Bosnyák and Berend, the new Zionist-dominated organization would have been a 10-member council (5 religious and 5 lay) called the "Communal Organization of the Jews of Hungary" (Hungarian: Magyarországi Zsidók Közösségi Szervezete; MAZSIOSZ) with Berend's role as secretary-general, who would have been responsible for daily operation. Berend explained the continuous contact with the perpetrators of the Holocaust with that "it is clear that in times of trials, those concerned about the lives of our people must find a way to those exercising power. And to apply the methods of the Lipótmező treatment [asylum] to fanatical, obsessed lunatics, that is, to leave it up to »Napoleon« that he really is Napoleon, to the »Emperor« that he is the emperor, and so on, and to extort concessions, gain time, postponement from them".

At the same time, deportations in countryside were already in full swing. The Jews of Szigetvár were interned to the Barcs internment (collection) camp on 26 April 1944. In order to obtain the valuables of rich Jews, the gendarmes used brutal methods to extract confessions. Prior to that, Berend was arrested by the Gestapo on 17 April 1944, allegedly for listening the BBC Radio. He was held captive in Pécs. A ministerial decree of Andor Jaross on 22 April 1944 re-organized the Central Jewish Council as the nine-member Association of Hungarian Jews Provisional Executive Committee (Hungarian: Magyarországi Zsidók Szövetségének Ideiglenes Intéző Bizottsága) with the effect of 8 May 1944 (but, this council itself de facto came to exist already on 1 May). Berend was freed soon, because he was delegated to the council upon the intervention of Zoltán Bosnyák. He was granted a railway travel permit from the Gestapo. Randolph L. Braham considered that Berend's inclusion in the council was apparently decided already before the promulgation of the decree. He was appointed formally on 8 May 1944 too.

=== Council member ===
Berend traveled to Budapest on 16 May 1944, receiving an exemption certificate from the Jewish Council two days later. Berend's appointment to the council created general distrust between him and Stern's circle. On the orders of latter, some confidential documents had to be destroyed, because it was known that "Berend had entered the Jewish Council as a traitor". In his memoir, Stern described Berend as the "confidant of László Endre and Zoltán Bosnyák", who also maintained good relations with representatives of the Gestapo and secret police. According to Braham, Berend aimed to represent the poorer and "little unprotected" Jewish strata within the central council, against the leading triumvirate of Samu Stern and his two colleagues, Károly Wilhelm and Ernő Pető. Berend himself also stated in his memoir that his reception was "openly hostile" in the Jewish Council. Among its members, there were rumors that Berend was appointed to the body on the wishes of László Endre. Shortly after his arrival, Berend and his wife were arrested on 27 May 1944, accusing them of using false documents to free their relatives from the internment camps. They were transferred to Sátoraljaújhely then Munkács (present-day Mukachevo, Ukraine). Soon, they were freed on 2 June, after an alleged torture, at the intercession of Adolf Eichmann. In his memoir, Berend accused Stern that he reported him to the Gestapo, that Berend violates German interests, opposes extraditions and puts obstacles in the way of smooth cooperation. some post-war testimony seems to confirm that Stern and his circle were involved in Berend's arrest, even if perhaps not in relation to these charges.

In the coming months, Berend frequently met Zoltán Bosnyák, but his requests and submissions were not really considered. Through him, Berend had an entry permit to the Ministry of the Interior, where he negotiated with department heads Albert Takáts and Zsigmond Székely-Molnár, subordinates to Endre. In order to stop the deportations, Berend submitted various drafts that encouraged the use of Jews as a workforce in Hungary, relying on various military economic data. However, Berend did nothing to reduce the suspicions surrounding him, he did not seek cooperation with the other members of the council, he did not initiate them into his plans, he acted independently of them, acting on his own initiative, which thus maintained the distrust between him and Stern. However, due to his relationship with Bosnyák and the other officials, Berend managed to acquire special permits for the other members of the council to visit the Ministry of the Interior during the course of their rescue efforts.

According to modern historiography, The Jewish Council of Budapest played a prominent role in that process at the end of which Miklós Horthy decided to stop the deportation of Jews at the beginning of July 1944, thus saving a significant part of Budapest's Jews. Through Bosnyák, Béla Berend liaised László Ferenczy with members of the council in order to implement the plan, the so-called Koszorús campaign. During their trial, Ferenczy and his deputy Leó László Lulay recalled that Berend collected anti-German materials and sent a copy of the Auschwitz Protocols to the regent through them. When Eichmann carried out the deportations in Kistarcsa, despite Horthy's order, Berend led a three-member delegation of the council to Ferenczy, asking to prevent it. Throughout August and September, a mock plan was drawn up by Ferenczy, with the cooperation of the Jewish council, that the Jews of Budapest are gathered in internment camps beyond the city limits. The plan served to bide time until the Red Army crossed the country's border. Stern later dissuaded the regent from this plan, because concentrating the Jews in one place would have made it easier for the Gestapo to deport or annihilate them, as Ernő Pető and Stern himself remembered. According to Béla Berend, general distrust between the council and Horthy's staff (mainly the gendarmes Ferenczy and Lulay) ended this project.

As a council member, Berend strongly opposed the conversion of Jews to either form of Christianity. Several thousand people converted from Judaism in Budapest throughout in 1944. Berend accused the Christian Jewish Council, among others, for this phenomenon. Berend even gave an anonymous, and later controversial interview to a far-right newspaper Harc! (the official journal of Zoltán Bosnyák's institute) on the subject, in which he emphasized that it is not possible to leave Judaism, "one can only be born a non-Jew, but with baptism, never". Berend claimed the purpose of these conversions is only to rescue assets, and "Christian churches become asset-saving asylums, because of the many frightened Israelites, who are running away from standing, struggling with inhibitions, refusing their blood".

=== In the Budapest Ghetto ===
Following the Arrow Cross Party coup and Horthy's arrest and removal (15–16 October 1944), the members of the triumvirate, Stern, Wilhelm and Pető went into hiding, while Ferenczy was commissioned to establish a new Jewish council, of which Berend remained a member. The Ferenc Szálasi government decided to establish the Budapest Ghetto on 29 November 1944. Berend was an active leader during the existence of the ghetto, headquartered at Síp utca 12. Under his guidance, the Zionists established a document forgery plant there in order to declare many Jews as non-Jews by the Arrow Cross Party authorities so they could live outside the ghetto. Meanwhile, the arriving Soviets began to besiege Budapest. All council members had contacts and liaison officers from the Arrow Cross Party. In this capacity, Berend maintained contact with József Sarlósi, head of the party's infamous headquarters (the "House of Vengeance") at Szent István Boulevard. Berend also tried to correspond with the Arrow Cross Party leadership, emphasizing his Zionist ideas, thus a common point of interest. In mid-December 1944, he urged the leaders of the party to prevent robberies and murders and protect the ghetto area with disciplined party members. At the end of the letter, he promised that after the war all Jews will leave Hungary.

A Jewish ghetto police was established within the Budapest Ghetto, and the number of its personnel varied between 700–900 during the ghetto's one and a half-month existence. Berend exercised supervisory authority over the board, according to the surviving documents, he also gave instructions to its leaders Miklós Szirt then Ernő Szalkai. Through Berend and Lajos Gottesman, the Zionists were overrepresented in the management of the ghetto police. Alongside Miksa Domonkos, Berend was the most active member of the council, who tried to improve the living conditions of the Jews within the ghetto. He dealt with the Arrow Cross Party authorities for the release of Jews or the supplying of the ghetto, and consoled the ill and the hungry. Berend usually left the ghetto in Catholic guise to visit shelters and celebrate services. During one of his trips, he acquired a thousand certificate of baptism form for printing and for the Zionists' document factory. Through these, they were able to smuggle patients out of the ghettos and place them in hospitals. Berend also performed ritual services at the mass graves of the ghetto, especially the Klauzál Square.

== Post-war trial ==
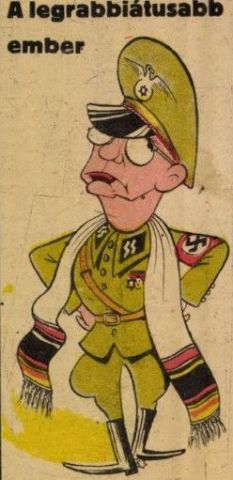
Ludas Matyi's caricature depicts Berend wearing SS uniform (August 1946)

Shortly after the Red Army liberated the ghetto on 17 January 1945, Berend left Budapest and moved to Sátoraljaújhely to the surviving relatives of his second wife, Ilona Windt. Within days, he was arrested on accusation of fascist collaboration by NKVD on 23 January, but he was released soon. He was arrested again and transferred to Budapest in late April 1945. He was taken into custody on 18 May 1945. According to the accusations, he was an informant of the Gestapo during the Holocaust. Under violent interrogations and tortures in the headquarters of the Budapest Department of State Political Police (PRO) in May–June 1945, Berend testified that he gave the property of the deported Jews of Szigetvár to the gendarmes, reported the activities of the other members of the Jewish Council of Budapest to the Nazi authorities, raped numerous women during the German occupation and kept Jewish property seized himself. PRO used the letters of Berend to László Endre, in which he argued for the emigration of the Jews, as evidences. However, the war criminal Endre testified in his own trial that he never answered these letters, and Berend was never his spy nor a participant of the deportations in Szigetvár. Simultaneously with the interrogations, the pro-Communist newspapers (e.g. Magyar Nemzet, Reggel, Szabad Szó, Ludas Matyi) launched a series of disparaging campaigns against Berend, calling him a "Nazi-puppet rabbi" and the "informant of the Gestapo". The press mentioned his friendship with the notorious anti-Semite Zoltán Bosnyák. Allegedly, Berend watched the deportations in Szigetvár while reading a far-right newspaper (Magyarság) and laughing, which became a widely spread topos about his person. In one of its caricatures, Ludas Matyi depicted Berend wearing SS uniform and prayer scarf.

Prosecutor Mihály Rhosóczy of the People's Prosecutor's Office of Budapest submitted his indictment against Berend to the People's Tribunal of Budapest on 4 July 1946. Berend was accused of war crimes and acts against the people. According to the indictment, Berend was an informant of the gendarmes, the Arrow Cross Party and the Gestapo regarding the whereabouts of the Jewish wealth and also took part in a raid to the International Ghetto (Pozsonyi út) in January 1945. He collaborated with Bosnyák to transfer Jewish ritual artifacts and books to the Jewish Question Institute. He expropriated jewelry taken from the dead in the Budapest Ghetto, abusing his authority. Berend's aforementioned interview to the far-right journal Harc! was a significant point of the accusation. Berend's trial began on 2 August 1946, which was heard for another four days in October–November 1946. His defense lawyer was Károly Dietz. Berend denied all charges and spoke of torture occurred in the building of PRO. He argued that he supported Zionism and thus the migration of Jews to Palestine, because this would have saved the lives of a significant part of the Jewry, and in this matter he tried to influence the anti-Semitic politicians. He denied that he had provided benefits to women in Szigetvár or the ghetto for sexual services. Regarding his interview, all his former colleagues (Munkácsi, Hahn) defended the content of the article. The trial highlighted the personal conflict between Stern and Berend in the previous years. Former leading members of the Jewish council appeared as witnesses, and all of them spoke positively of Berend's activities during the Holocaust. According to István Földes, Berend in many cases personally handled the internees' case. Munkácsi testified that Berend helped "many people" by obtaining false documents. Domonkos praised him that, in the last weeks of the ghetto, Berend took care of the pastoral duties almost single-handedly. Nevertheless, Berend had influential connections with the authorities. For instance, József Nagy was granted access to the Ministry of the Interior for his intercession. Other testimonies emphasized that he procured medicines, hid runaway forced labour workers and maintained a counterfeiting operation in his office. On 23 November 1946, the People's Tribunal found Berend guilty on two counts of the indictment and sentenced him to ten-year imprisonment. Senior judge István Gálfalvy formulated a dissenting opinion, in which he wrote that Berend can only be condemned for his aforementioned interview alone. In April 1947, the NOT acquitted Berend of all charges. Contemporary press (Szabad Nép) was not satisfied with the verdict and continued to see him as a Nazi collaborator.

== Later life ==
Berend emigrated to the United States in September 1947, becoming a rabbi of a religious community in Philadelphia. His wife remained in Hungary. He adopted the name Albert Bruce Belton, which was legalized in June 1954. Berend served as rabbi of various communities: in Dubuque, Iowa (1950–1953), Ardmore, Oklahoma (1953–1959), then Clearwater, Florida (around 1963) and New York City. During his services, he fabricated various cover stories for himself. According to his memoir, he was always forced to leave his posts in a short time as a result of "irresponsible and defamatory rumours". Contrary to his earlier Zionist views, Berend also worked as a librarian at the Reform Jewish and anti-Zionist American Council for Judaism (ACJ) from 1956 to 1959, but he was also affiliated with the New York Board of Rabbis at the same time. Berend intended to return to Hungary in 1957 and 1973, but the Hungarian Jewish leaders in their correspondence did not advise him to do so. During his American exile, Berend was oriented towards a much more liberal position. For instance, he performed rabbinical weddings for couples of mixed religions too. After the assassination of John F. Kennedy, he bid farewell to the president with a Catholic prayer. He also spoke in favor of the civil rights of African Americans. He even celebrated at ecumenical services with representatives of other religions. In many cases he sent telegrams to politicians and public figures calling for maximum support for Israel, especially during the Six-Day War.

During his years of emigration, Berend was not satisfied with the acquittal, but wanted recognition and praise for his actions during the Holocaust. Therefore, he sent the supporting documents created during the trial to several institutes (e.g. Yad Vashem). At the Eichmann trial in 1961, a witness Pinchas Freudiger, also a former member of the Jewish Council of Budapest, called Berend as a "Nazi informer". As a result, Berend sent a complaint letter to deputy prosecutor Gabriel Bach demanding that his name be removed from the case file and referred to "Baron" Freudiger's alleged "friendship" with Dieter Wisliceny.

György Moldova published autobiographically inspired series of writings called Szent Imre-induló in a journal Kortárs in 1975. In the work, Berend appears as a fat and evil collaborator, and the well-known topos regarding the Szigetvár deportations (see above) is also repeated. Berend sued the journal Kortárs for defamation. The court rejected the lawsuit at first and second instance, because although Berend was acquitted by the People's Tribunal, "in the given situation, he deserved disapproval from a social or religious point of view". During the trial, historian experts – Jenő Lévai and Elek Karsai – did not consider Moldova's opinion about Berend's collaboration to be unfounded. The Supreme Court approved that Berend can be called a "traitor" because it indicates an "evaluative statement" and not a statement of facts. Nevertheless, when Szent Imre-induló was published as a novel by Magvető in the same year, Moldova changed Berend's name to Béla Bárány in the text.

Berend was embroiled into conflict with the famous Holocaust historian Randolph L. Braham too. The scholar contacted with him in 1972, and their relationship was initially cooperative, the rabbi shared important documents with Braham to aid his research. Braham published and translated such reminiscences from Stern and Freudiger that condemned Berend. Therefore, the rabbi filed a lawsuit against Braham in December 1973. After a series of postponements, the New York Supreme Court heard the case in February 1979, rejecting Berend's claim for multi-million USD damages. According to the judge, Braham merely collected historical sources and made no malicious claims. Berend appealed several times, but both the New York Court of Appeals and the Supreme Court of the United States ruled against him. Berend last sued Braham in 1984, to no avail. Béla Berend died in New York City on 24 June 1987.

== Sources ==
- Berend, Béla (2023). Veszprémy, László Bernát (ed.). "A magyar Dreyfus-ügy [The Hungarian Dreyfus Affair]". Kommentár (in Hungarian). 18 (1): 154–162. ISSN 1787-6974.
- Braham, Randolph L. (1981). The Politics of Genocide: The Holocaust in Hungary. Vol. 1–2. New York: Columbia University Press. ISBN 0-231-04496-8.
- Munkácsi, Ernő (1947). Hogyan történt? Adatok és okmányok a magyar zsidóság tragédiájához [How It Happened: Documenting the Tragedy of Hungarian Jewry] (in Hungarian). Budapest: Renaissance.
- Munkácsi, Krisztina (1996). "Berend Béla főrabbi népbírósági pere [The Trial of Chief Rabbi Béla Berend before the People's Tribunal]". Századok (in Hungarian). 130 (6). Magyar Történelmi Társulat: 1525–1552. ISSN 0039-8098.
- Schmidt, Mária (1990). Kollaboráció vagy kooperáció? A Budapesti Zsidó Tanács [Collaboration or Cooperation? The Jewish Council of Budapest] (in Hungarian). Budapest: Minerva. ISBN 963-223-438-3.
- Veszprémy, László Bernát (2017-07-15). "„Nyilas rabbi", vagy különös hős? – Berend Béla emlékezete [Arrow Cross Rabbi or a Strange Hero? Béla Berend's memory]". Szombat Online (in Hungarian).
- Veszprémy, László Bernát (2023). Tanácstalanság. A zsidó vezetés Magyarországon és a holokauszt, 1944–1945 [Bereft of Council. Jewish leadership in Hungary during the Holocaust in 1944–1945] (in Hungarian). Budapest: Jaffa Kiadó. ISBN 978-963-475-731-3.
