= Peter Munk =

Hungarian-Canadian businessman (1927–2018)

Peter Munk CC
- Born: November 8, 1927; Budapest, Hungary
- Died: March 28, 2018 (aged 90); Toronto, Ontario, Canada
- Education: University of Toronto
- Known for: Chairman, president and founder of Barrick Gold, philanthropy
- Spouses: Linda Joy Gutterson (m. 1956; div. 1970) Melanie Jane Bosanquet (m. 1973)
- Children: 5

Peter Munk CC (November 8, 1927 – March 28, 2018) was a Hungarian-Canadian businessman, investor, founder and philanthropist. He was the founder and chief executive officer of a number of high-profile business ventures, including the hi-fi electronics company Clairtone, real estate company Trizec Properties, and Barrick Gold, formerly the world's largest gold-mining corporation.

Munk is known for his philanthropy, as a donor to Munk School of Global Affairs at the University of Toronto and the Peter Munk Cardiac Centre at the Toronto General Hospital. He is also well known for supporting the Munk Debates.

== Early years and family ==
Munk was born in Budapest, into a prosperous Hungarian-Jewish family, the son of Katharina Adler Munk and Lajos "Louis" Munk (1898–1977). His grandfather, Gábor "Gabriel" Munk, had descended from a family of rabbis, was a brother of the noted linguist and ethnologist Bernát Munkácsi (né Munk), and uncle of the Hungarian jurist and writer Ernő Munkácsi. Gábor became wealthy via Austro-Hungarian distribution rights for the popular Viennese chocolate brand, Manner, invested in real estate, then, during World War II, used what remained of his fortune to buy safe passage out of Hungary to neutral Switzerland for members of his immediate family, including his grandson Peter.

Hungary was occupied by Nazi Germany in March 1944, when Munk was aged 16; along with 14 members of his family, he escaped on the Kastner train, which carried 1,684 Jews to safety in Switzerland. The journey had been arranged by Rudolf Kastner of the Zionist Aid and Rescue Committee, as a result of secret negotiations with Adolf Eichmann—the high-ranking Nazi had allowed some Jews to leave in exchange for money, gold, and diamonds, part of a series of so-called "blood for goods" deals. Munk's mother, who divorced his father when he was four, was deported from Budapest to Auschwitz concentration camp in 1944. She survived, but later died by suicide.

Munk arrived in Canada in 1948, via Switzerland, initially on a student visa, then graduated from the University of Toronto, in 1952, with a degree in electrical engineering. Decades later, he praised Canada: "I arrived in this place not speaking the language, not knowing a dog... This is a country that does not ask about your origins; it only concerns itself with your destiny."

== Career ==
=== Clairtone ===
In 1958, with $2,800 from his father-in-law, Webber Pharmaceuticals (now Webber Naturals) founder William Jay Gutterson, he co-founded Clairtone with Scandinavian furniture importer David Gilmour. Clairtone manufactured high-end console stereos, and later televisions, which were recognizable icons of their day. The most celebrated Clairtone designs were the striking "Project G" series, introduced in 1964, composed of sleek rosewood cabinets with cantilevered black aluminum "sound globes" (speakers). The Project G and G2 were seen in the films Marriage on the Rocks and The Graduate, awarded a silver medal for excellence at the Milan Triennial design exhibition, and endorsed by Frank Sinatra and Oscar Peterson. Fans of the Project G included Hugh Hefner.

Clairtone's downfall began with "an ill-advised plan to build a plant in Nova Scotia." The plant, built in Stellarton, opened in 1966 with funding from the province's Industrial Estates Limited (IEL). According to William Mingo, chief counsel for IEL, as quoted in his daughter Nina Munk's book about Clairtone, "Munk was too good a salesman for his own good. He could sell anything to anyone, including himself. My, he was a promoter. My, he had energy. My, he had charm. My, he had imagination." In 1967, as a result of mounting losses and in order to try to recoup its multi-million dollar investments, the Government of Nova Scotia took over Clairtone and fired Munk and Gilmour. Munk faced accusations of insider trading "that were eventually settled out of court." A report commissioned by Clairtone in the aftermath of the factory's failure found that one of the main issues was the local workforce. "The general population is basically not geared to the manufacturing frenzy and especially the five-day workweek... The welfare situation is such that it has created conditions similar to Appalachia in the United States where the third generation is already on relief."

=== Hospitality and real estate ===
After the collapse of Clairtone, Munk and Gilmour invested in a plot of ocean-front land in Fiji which they soon developed into a hotel and resort. This venture grew into the Southern Pacific Hotel Corporation, which at its peak consisted of 54 resorts in Australia and the South Pacific. In 1978, the firm signed a deal with the President of Egypt to build a resort near the Great Pyramids. When Anwar Sadat cancelled the project, Munk sued the Egyptian government, eventually winning the arbitration case at the International Centre for Settlement of Investment Disputes.

In 1979, Munk returned to Canada to start a new venture called Barrick, which he would eventually build into the world's largest gold company. At the time, bankers and the establishment viewed him as "a fugitive and a loser," according to Munk.

Munk was also founder, chairman, and CEO of Trizec Properties (formerly TrizecHahn Corporation), one of the largest American real estate investment trusts. In 2006, Trizec Properties was sold to Brookfield Properties in a transaction valued at approximately $9 billion.

In 2007, Munk invested with partners in Porto Montenegro, a former naval base on the Adriatic Sea, turning it into a superyacht destination to rival Cannes and Monte Carlo. He was the majority shareholder of Montport Capital, which owned the centrepieces of the complex, Porto Montenegro Marina and Resort. He developed the site on the Bay of Kotor, putting Montenegro on the map for high-end tourism. In 2016 Munk sold the marina and hotel to Investment Corporation of Dubai, a sovereign wealth fund, for an undisclosed amount, believed to be about 200 million euros.

=== Barrick Gold ===
In 1980, Munk created Barrick Petroleum to invest in the oil sector, but he quickly realized that investments in this sector were ruinous. After the acquisition of a small company, Camflo Mines, Barrick left the oil sector and became overnight a mining company. In 2011, Munk planned to merge with Glencore, Ivan Glasenberg's company, to create one of the world's largest commodities giants on par with BHP and Rio Tinto. The gold market was not aligned with Glencore's other activities, however, and the deal did not go through.

In 2008, Munk, as the chair of Barrick Gold, intervened at the shareholder meeting to block a proxy shareholder, who had travelled from Papua New Guinea for the meeting, from speaking about her reports of deadly violence and sexual violence perpetuated by Barrick Gold's security contractors at Porgera Gold Mine.

By 2016, Barrick had proven and probable reserves of two billion tons (1.33 grams of gold per tonne of ore). It is the world's largest gold mining company and the largest Canadian company by capitalization. Munk retired from the day-to-day management but he remained the founder and President Emeritus. "Barrick is my legacy," Munk said.

== Charitable contributions ==
In 1992, the Peter and Melanie Munk Charitable Foundation was founded. It has disbursed more than $300 million to a variety of organizations that work to improve the health, education and international reputation of Canadians. In a speech he delivered in September 2017, on announcing a $100 million donation to the Peter Munk Cardiac Centre at the Toronto General Hospital, Munk spoke of his philanthropy in the context of his gratitude to the country that saved his life: "You opened the door. You gave us everything," he added, referring to Canada as "paradise."

=== Education ===
Munk was a major donor to the University of Toronto, his alma mater. Beginning with a gift of $35 million in 2010, the Munk Foundation enabled the establishment of the Munk School of Global Affairs and Public Policy at the University of Toronto. In total, Munk gave $51 million to his alma mater. The Peter Munk Professor of Entrepreneurship at the Joseph L. Rotman School of Management is named after him.

Peter Munk also made a substantial donation of $43 million to Technion – Israel Institute of Technology to establish that university's Peter Munk Research Institute.

=== Public policy ===
In 2016, Munk made a $5 million donation to the Fraser Institute, a think tank, to launch the Peter Munk Centre for Free Enterprise Education.

==== Aurea Foundation ====
Peter Munk and Melanie Munk established the Aurea Foundation in 2006. Subsequently, Peter Munk established the semi-annual Munk Debates in 2008 with a $12 million donation from Aurea Foundation, a sub-division of his primary charitable foundation.

=== Health ===
In 1997, Munk helped create the Peter Munk Cardiac Centre at the Toronto General Hospital with an initial donation of $6 million. In May 2006, he announced that he would donate another $37 million, at the time the largest gift ever made to a Canadian medical institution. In September 2017, he donated another $100 million. As well, Peter and Melanie Munk established University Health Network’s first endowed chair for the cardiac program: the Melanie Munk Chair in Cardiovascular Surgery.

=== Controversy ===
A contract between the Munk Foundation and the University of Toronto came under criticism due to the secrecy that shrouded its approval, and the fact that Munk's contribution of $35 million were conditional on $25 million contributions each by the federal government and the university. Coming at a time of downsizing and threats to the funding of other academic units, critics charge that these decisions are emblematic of the government's and the University's ceding of academic resource allocation decisions to the corporate sector.

According to Linda McQuaig's book, The Trouble with Billionaires, Munk's donation to the University of Toronto came with strings attached to ensure that the school would "fit with the political views and sensitivities of Peter Munk." McQuaig writes that "according to Munk's written agreement with the university, the Munk donations will be paid over an extended time period, with much of the money to be paid years from now – and subject to the Munk family's approval of the school. For that matter, the school's director will be required to report annually to a board appointed by Munk 'to discuss the programs, activities and initiatives of the School in greater detail.'"

University president David Naylor rejected personal attacks on donors as "a deplorable affront to the values of rational and respectful discourse that are supposed to characterize a university" and stated "I later served on the board of the University Health Network, in the years when Dr. Munk made two gifts exceeding $40 million to support the cardiovascular program at that hospital. There was not a single instance where Peter Munk interfered with the educational, research or clinical priorities of the institution."

== Personal life ==
On September 3, 1956, Munk married Linda Joy Gutterson, the daughter of a Forest Hill pharmaceutical entrepreneur who gave Munk the start-up capital to fund his first company. Linda was 19, not long out of Havergal College; he was 10 years older. "'Linda tracked me down with a laser beam,' said Munk. 'I was a curiosity; I was different. Not because I was so great, let me tell you, I was fat, bald, poor, a boring engineering student.'" The couple separated and reunited more than once in the 1960s, having three children and divorcing in 1970 but staying on very good terms. After the marriage was over, she pursued an academic career, becoming a professor of English at the University of Toronto.

On June 26, 1973, Munk married his second wife, Melanie Jane Bosanquet, in London with whom he had two more children. She is the cousin of Charles Palmer-Tomkinson, a British land-owner and Olympic skier. Munk skied for 71 years, and built with his wife in 1972 a ski chalet called Viti Levu in Klosters, which they consider home. It overlooks the mountain of Gotschnagrat.

His children are: Anthony Munk, a senior managing director at Onex private equity; Nina Munk, a journalist and contributing editor for Vanity Fair; Marc-David Munk, a physician and healthcare executive; Natalie; and Cheyne. In his late 70s Munk was fitted with a pacemaker.

== Views ==
In 2008, Munk praised Canada for being a place where he could come as an immigrant, without wealth, knowledge, language skills or a network and set up a successful business and grow it into an empire.

== Death ==
Munk died in Toronto on March 28, 2018, at the age of 90. The cause of death was not disclosed, but Munk had been dealing with heart problems for several years and wore a pacemaker.

The Financial Post posthumously lauded him as "An entrepreneur with a Midas touch, he was one of Canada's most high-flying, international deal makers, with friends ranging from Brian Mulroney and Prince Charles to the arms dealer Adnan Khashoggi and French billionaire Bernard Arnault, as well as one its most generous benefactors."

== Honours ==
He received several honorary degrees:

- Doctorate from Upsala College, New Jersey in 1991
- Doctorate from Bishop's University, Quebec in 1995
- Doctor of Laws from Trinity College, University of Toronto in 1995
- Doctorate from Concordia University, Montreal in 1999
- Doctorate from Technion – Israel Institute of Technology, Haifa, Israel in 2001
- Doctor of Sacred Letters from Trinity College, University of Toronto in 2004, jointly with his wife Melanie Munk

He became Officer of The Order of Canada (the country's highest civilian honour) in 1993 and was promoted to Companion in 2008; received The Woodrow Wilson Award for Corporate Citizenship in 2002 (the first time awarded outside the U.S.); was inducted into the Canadian Business Hall of Fame, and the Canadian Mining Hall of Fame. In 2012 Munk was awarded the Queen Elizabeth II Diamond Jubilee Medal. His homeland awarded him the Commander's Cross with Star of the Order of Merit of the Republic of Hungary in 2016.
