= The Shops on Steeles and 404 =

The Shops on Steeles and 404 (formerly Markham Place)
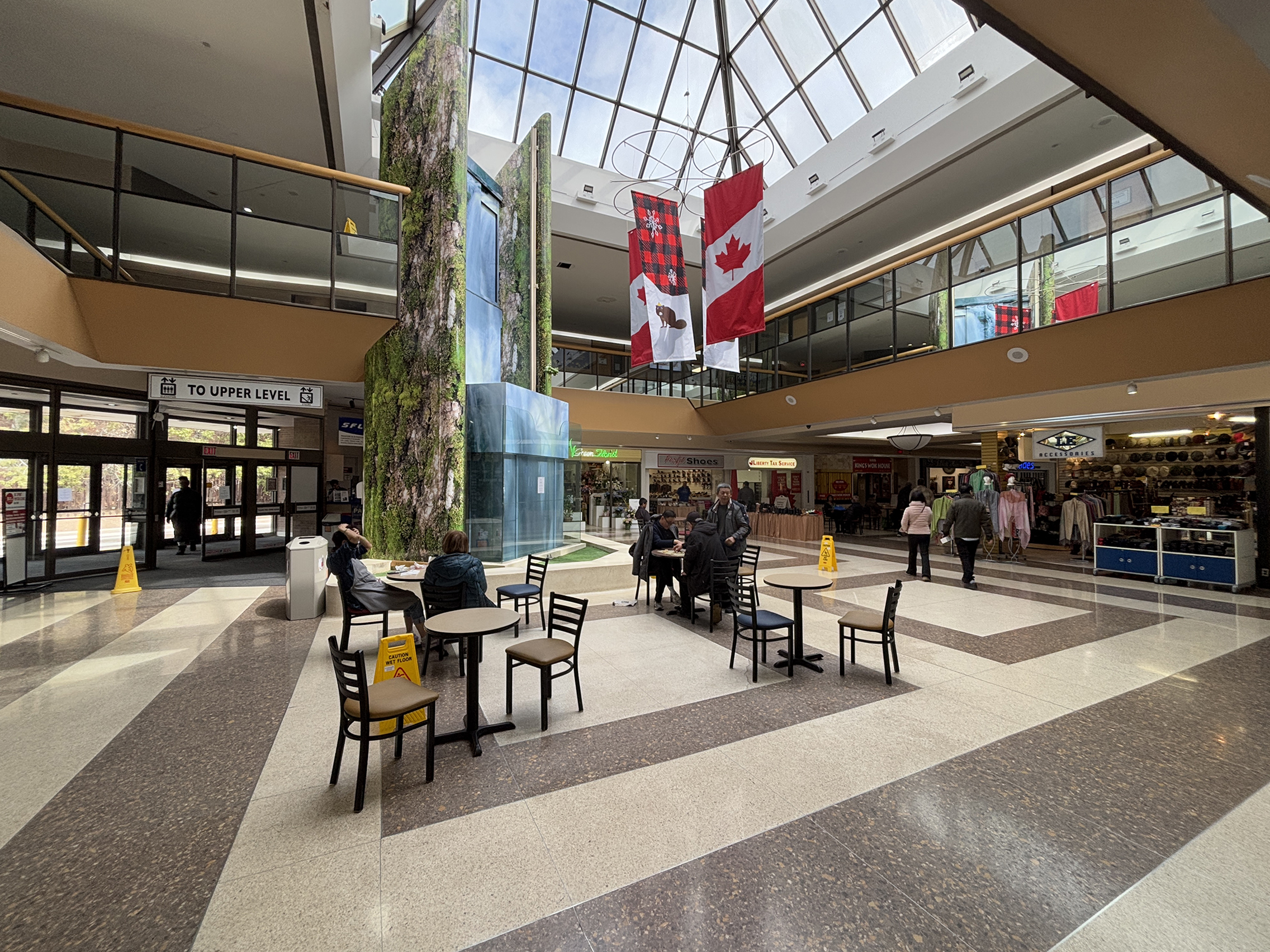
- Atrium of the mall in 2025
- Location: Markham, Ontario, Canada
- Coordinates: 43°48′48″N 79°21′30″W
- Opened: 1977
- Developer: Trizec Properties
- Manager: Trizec Properties (formerly), Bramalea (company) (formerly), Wycliffe Property Management (formerly), Tuckernuck Management Services
- Architect: Bregman & Hamann Architects and Maxwell Miller (former Sears store)
- Num. of stores: 50
- Num. of anchor tenants: 3
- Floors: 2
- Parking: outdoor street level and above former Sears (closed off due to safety concerns)
- Public transit: TTC 51 Leslie, 53 Steeles East, 953 Steeles East, 25 Don Mills, and 925 Don Mills; YRT 3 Thornhill 90B Leslie, and 90 Leslie
- Website: www.shopsonsteeles.ca

The Shops on Steeles and 404 is a 50-store community mall at the corner of Steeles Avenue East and Don Mills Road in Markham, Ontario. The mall is anchored by Food Basics, Hwy 404 & Steeles Flea Market, and Krazy Dealz. Aside from a few chains, the mall is mostly independent stores.

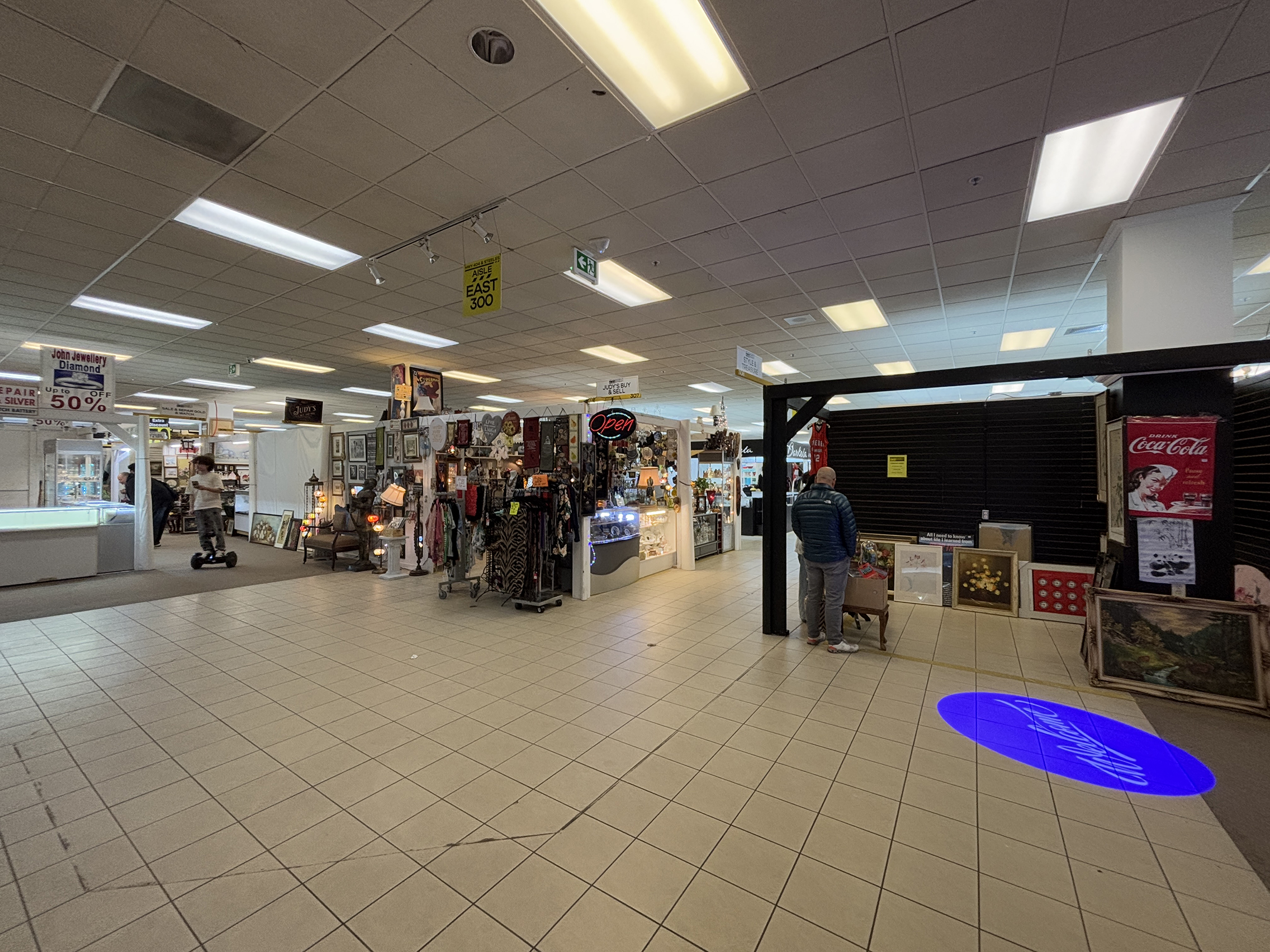
Flea Market in Level 1

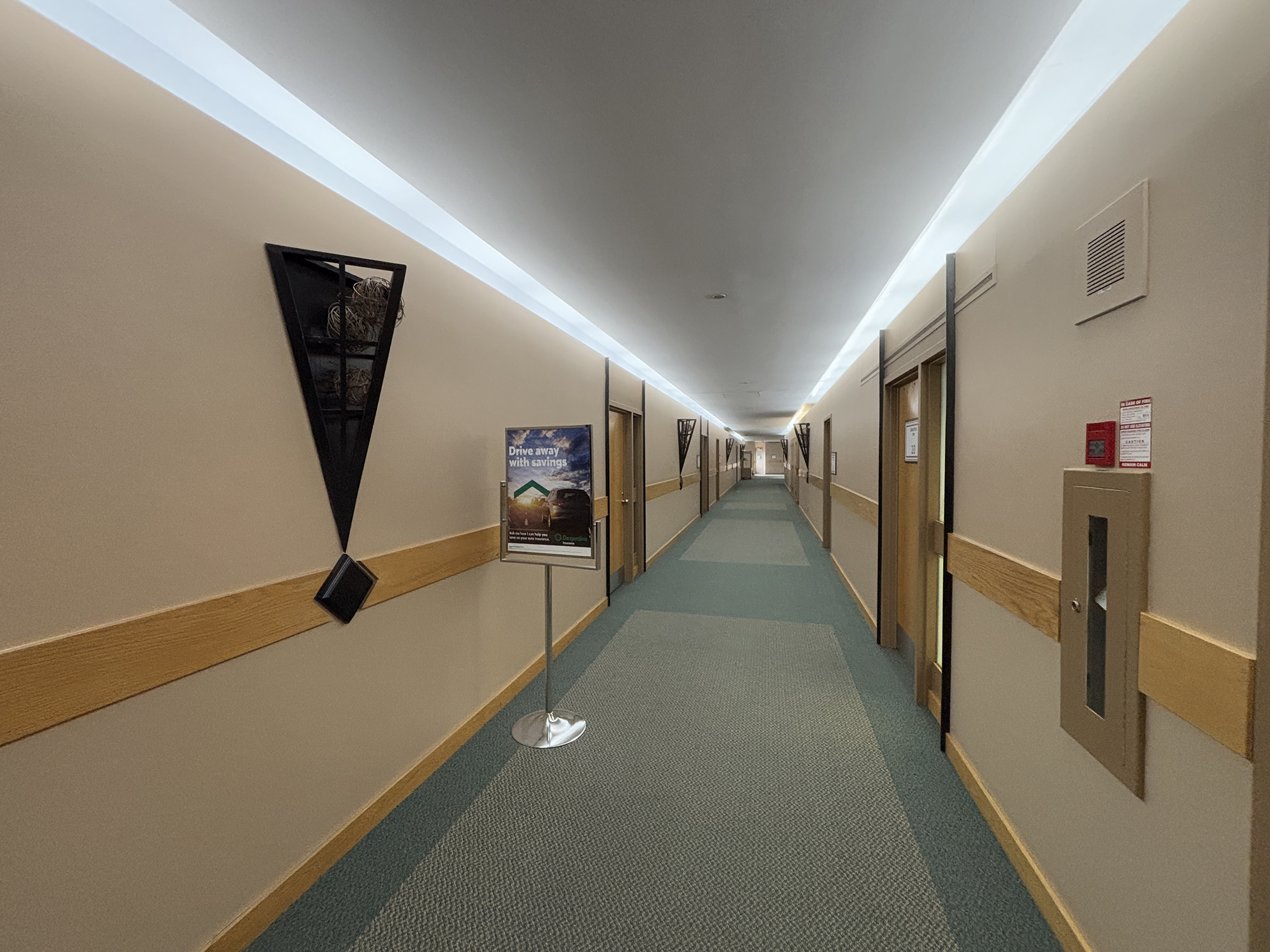
Level 2

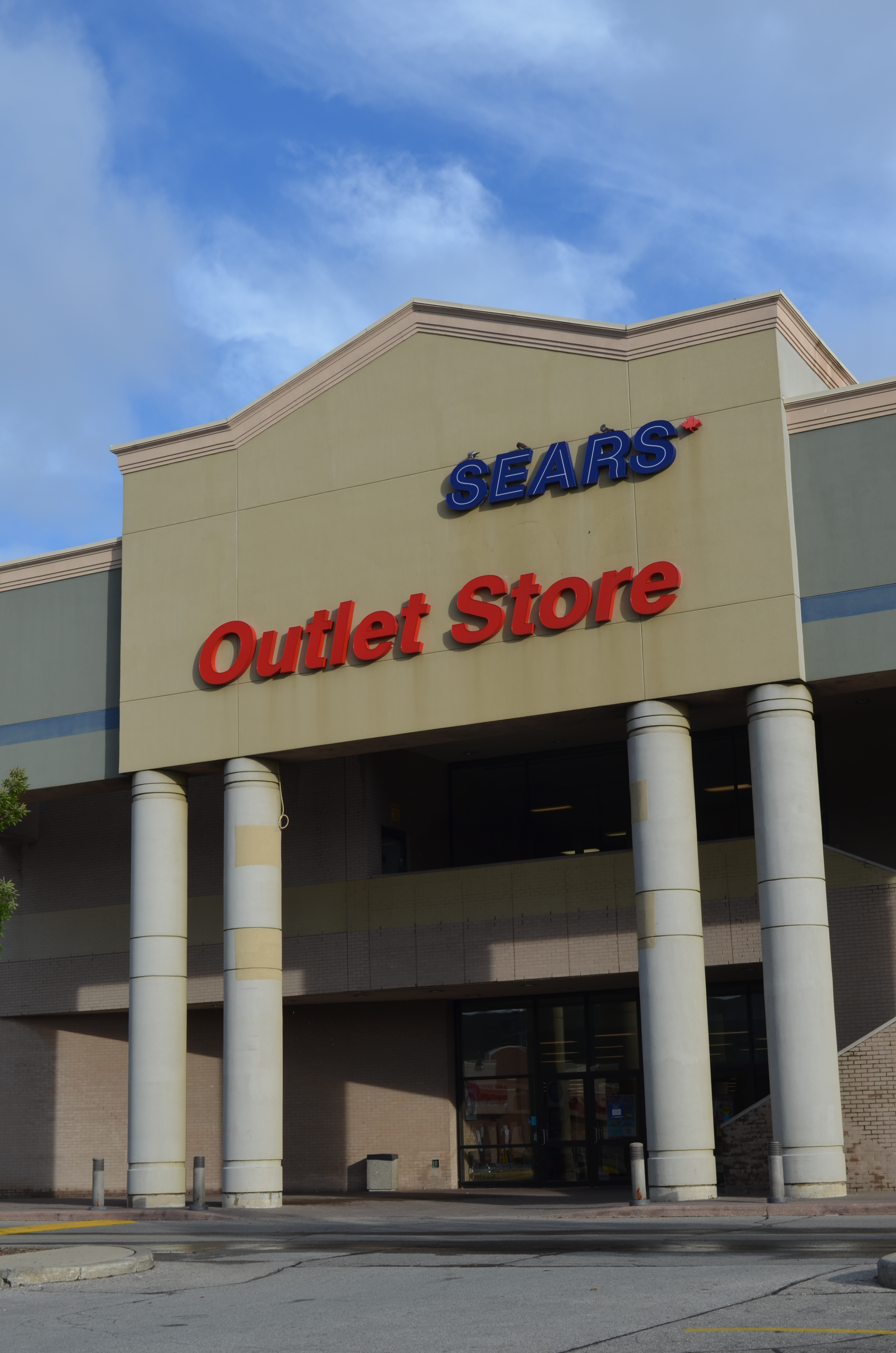
A (now shuttered) Sears outlet store at The Shops on Steeles and 404 in Thornhill, Ontario.

== History ==
Construction began in the early 1970s with an intended completion in 1975. However, delays resulting from an electricians strike pushed the malls opening by two years to 1977. The architect contracted to design the mall was B+H Architects, alongside with Maxwell Miller for the Sears location (former Chief Architect for Simpsons-Sears). The mall officially opened as Markham Place (proposed as Markham Marketplace), and was jointly developed by Trizec Properties.

The mall was anchored by a Miracle Mart supermarket and a Sears Canada department store. The Sears store was opened as a full-line department store, featuring an auto centre, cafeteria, hair salon, and a travel centre.

The Sears location was presented a Design Award by the Ontario Masons Relations Council in 1978 for "outstanding architectural design and masonry workmanship."

In 1986, Markham Place was sold to Bramalea (company). It is notable to note that Trizec Properties held majority stake in Bramalea during this time period. In 1995, Bramalea filed for bankruptcy and subsequently liquidated their remaining assets including Markham Place. It was around this time that the mall's name changed from Markham Place to The Shops on Steeles and 404.

Following their bankruptcy in 1992, the Miracle Mart anchor was succeeded by Food Basics.

On March 31st, 2000, Sears sold off their interests in the mall and continued to operate their location under a lease agreement.

In 2004, Sears Canada announced that they would exit the automotive industry. As a result, the auto centre in the Sears was converted to a Active Green + Ross.

The Sears location was converted into a Sears Home store with a newly added facade (selling furniture and appliances; upper level as an outlet centre) and in recent years as a Sears Outlet Store. The location closed in April of 2017 in an effort to shutter unprofitable stores. (Sears Canada filed for bankruptcy in 2018).

Bobby's Liquidation Outlet occupied the anchor tenant space vacated by Sears. A liquidation outlet called Closeout King was located within the anchor building as well, but was removed after five months of non-payment. In January 2019 Bobby's Outlet closed (moved to Promenade Mall in Vaughan) with mall owners planning to re-develop the space.

In recent years, Wycliffe Property Management owned and operated the mall until 2023 where it was sold. Management of the mall was subsequently assumed by Tuckernuck Management Services.

As of 2025, the lower floor of the former Sears space is now occupied by a flea market. The upper level tenant of the former Sears is now a liquidation outlet centre called Krazy Dealz.

== Aborted redevelopment ==
In 2007, the mall was slated for residential re-development called Markhamgate Summit, with some retail stores at ground level, as well as a new transit hub for the Toronto Transit Commission and York Region Transit. Although the land is in Markham, Ontario (in the community of Thornhill, Ontario), Toronto city councillor David Shiner invoked the 1974 Agreement, which grants Toronto limited planning authority over York Region land that is within 45 metres of Steeles Avenue, which Toronto owns, to veto the developer plans of several condominium towers. Shiner argued that the proposed number of residential units was too high which would create too much traffic in the neighborhood, while Markham councillor Howard Ian Shore and the developer countered that the project would not be viable if the number of residential units was lowered below the agreed-upon figure. As of 2018, the project has not proceeded and the original mall remains standing and operating.

== See also ==
- List of largest enclosed shopping malls in Canada
- List of shopping malls in Canada
