= Munak =

Munak may refer to:

- Munak, Haryana in India
- Munak, Nicobar in India
- Munak canal in India
- Munak, Khuzestan in Iran
- Munak, Lorestan in Iran
