= David Gilmour (businessman) =

Canadian businessman and investor (1931–2023)

- Born: November 5, 1931; Winnipeg, Canada
- Died: June 11, 2023 (aged 91); New York, New York, U.S.
- Occupations: Businessman, investor
- Known for: Founder of Fiji Water

David Harrison Gilmour (November 5, 1931 – June 11, 2023) was a Canadian businessman and investor. He was the founder of Fiji Water. Gilmour founded Wakaya Perfection in 2011, a multi-level marketing nutrition company.

== Early life ==
David Harrison Gilmour was born in Winnipeg on November 5, 1931, and grew up in Toronto. His father was Adam Gilmour, an investment banker, and his mother was Doris Godson Gilmour, an opera singer. At age 16, his father offered him the option between enough cash to start his own company, or a $10 stipend a day to go travelling in Europe on his own. He chose to go travelling, and believed he learned how to become an entrepreneur by observing other people on his travels.

== Career ==
Gilmour created his first company, Dansk Design, an importer of Scandinavian furniture and giftware. He then founded TrizecHahn, a real estate firm. In 1958, he co-founded Clairtone, a stereo maker, with Peter Munk. They then bought property in Fiji and started the hotel chain called the Southern Pacific Hotel Corporation in 1969. Less than a decade later, they sold it for $128 million. They then bought a $40 million gold mine in Northern Ontario, and co-founded Barrick Gold. He also bought Zinio, now one of the world's largest electronic distributors of magazines, books, catalogs and apps.

Gilmour later bought Wakaya Island in Fiji. It was sold to future (April 2019) convicted felon Clare Bronfman in 2016. In 1996, he co-founded Fiji Water with Peter Munk, after he found an aquifer in Yaqara Valley on Viti Levu. It became the No. 1 brand of imported water, even before Evian. In 2004, he sold it to Lynda Resnick for $50 million. He also founded Wakaya Club & Spa, a luxury resort on Wakaya Island. Prince Felipe of Spain and his wife Letizia, Nicole Kidman and her husband Keith Urban, Bill Gates and his wife Melinda, Steve Jobs, Rupert Murdoch, George Lucas, Michelle Pfeiffer, David E. Kelley, Robert Zemeckis, Paris Hilton, and Tom Cruise have all stayed in the resort. He has also built a village and a school for his Fiji workers.

== Personal life ==
His third wife, Jill, is a native of Auckland, New Zealand. They used to live on Wakaya Island four months a year. They also lived in Manhattan and Palm Beach, Florida.

Gilmour and his first wife, Anna, had a daughter named Erin who was found stabbed to death in her Toronto apartment, aged 22, on December 20, 1983. A suspect was identified through genetic genealogy and arrested in November 2022.

Gilmour died from a cardiac arrest in Manhattan on June 11, 2023, at the age of 91.

== Bibliography ==
- Start Up: The Life and Lessons of a Serial Entrepreneur (2011)
