= Bramalea =

Bramalea may refer to:

- Bramalea, Ontario, a neighbourhood of Brampton, built by Bramalea Limited
- Bramalea (company)
- Bramalea (horse), a Thoroughbred racehorse
