= Clairtone =

Canadian audiovisual equipment manufacturer

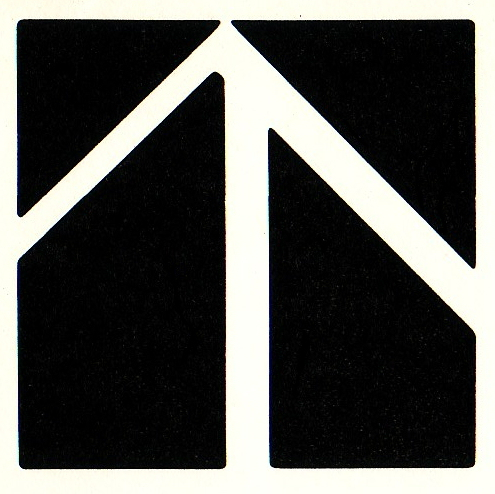
Clairtone logo.

Clairtone Sound Corporation Limited was a manufacturer of high-quality sound electronics and accessories based in Toronto, Ontario, Canada. Founded in 1958 by the Hungarian-born entrepreneur and electronics engineer Peter Munk with furniture designer David Gilmour, the company established an international reputation for stereo and cabinetry design in the 1960s. It failed little more than a decade later, but in its heyday it made a notable contribution to the field of consumer electronics.

== History ==
In 1959, Clairtone won a design award from Canada's National Industrial Design Council for its very first hi-fi model, the "100-S"—a long, low teak cabinet fitted with a Dual 1004 turntable, a Granco tube chassis, and speakers obscured by cream-colored broadcloth from Knoll. But the most famous Clairtone design was the futuristic Project G series designed by Hugh Spencer and introduced at the National Furniture Show in Chicago in January 1964. Striking, massive (nearly seven-feet long), and expensive ($1,600, or about $12,000 today), the Project G featured a rosewood cabinet mounted on a metal base, and, at either end, cantilevered black aluminum "sound globes" (a.k.a. speakers). The Project G introduced the now-standard modular approach to consumer audio that offered a dramatic departure from boxy cabinet design popular until that time (and which Clairtone also manufactured). The Project G won a silver medal at the 1964 Milan Triannale and is now widely considered a design icon.

Clairtone earned a reputation for combining modern designs with high-quality materials, and marketing them well. It opened its first international sales office in New York in 1960 and convinced Frank Sinatra and Oscar Peterson, among others luminaries, to endorse Clairtone's sound systems. "Listen to Sinatra on Clairtone stereo. Sinatra does," was one of the company's memorable tag lines. The Project G system was featured in the films Marriage on the Rocks and The Graduate, marking an early example of product placement, and Clairtone hired the fashion photographer Irving Penn to photograph the hi-fi for its promotional booklets and brochures. The Project G came to epitomize the ethos of the Swinging Sixties when Hugh Hefner bought one for the Playboy Mansion.

In 1963, Clairtone began trading publicly on the Toronto Stock Exchange. At its peak, demand for Clairtone's stereos in Canada and the U.S. was so great that for a time the company's factory stayed open around the clock. But even as sales soared and it was winning awards for its innovative designs, Clairtone was facing insurmountable financial troubles. In 1963, it earned a profit of $300,000 on sales of $10 million, and profits decreased the following year as marketing costs rose higher than sales.

Early investor Frank Sobey, who had been mayor of Stellarton, Nova Scotia from 1937 to 1959 and was then president of Industrial Estates Limited (IEL), helped the company obtain financial support from the Government of Nova Scotia to open an electronics manufacturing plant in Stellarton. The company decided to switch production to televisions at this time and was fully operational in Stellarton by the summer of 1966. There were close to 1,000 employees at the time.

Clairtone launched its new G-TV television set with its usual flair, hiring the cinematographer Fritz Spiess to direct a TV advertisement that starred Peter Munk and David Gilmour driving a 1936 Pierce-Arrow convertible across the Brooklyn Bridge—with a Clairtone TV set in the back seat (the ad, titled "New York," can be found on YouTube today). But Clairtone's entry into the color television market was ill-timed (the market would not take off for another five years; see History of Television). Sales were exceedingly poor, with annual losses in 1967 of more than $6 million, and the business began to spiral out of control. In October, 1967, Industrial Estates Limited, an economic development agency of the Government of Nova Scotia, took over control of the company from Peter Munk and David Gilmour. Sales continued to decline and the share price plunged from more than $15 in 1967 to a few cents by 1970.

A confidential study commissioned by Clairtone in 1967 found that the failure of the plant was in part due to the local workforce: "The general population is basically not geared to the manufacturing frenzy and especially the five-day workweek... The welfare situation is such that it has created conditions similar to Appalachia in the United States where the third generation is already on relief." But, as reported by Peter Munk's daughter, the financial journalist Nina Munk, in her 2008 book about Clairtone (The Art of Clairtone: The Making of a Design Icon, 1958-1971), the labour force in Stellarton was only one of many problems: "Nothing went smoothly, from all accounts. Cost controls were 'nonexistent,' according to the commissioned study. Roads leading to the factory were so bad that Clairtone's stereos and TVs were often damaged en route. Getting parts for the stereos, a task that at the old plant in Rexdale, Ontario, could be organized in a single day, took several weeks. As for the manufacturing process itself, Clairtone's inexperienced management team was over its head, and sinking: inventory went missing; unidentified parts accumulated on the factory floor; the assembly line seldom if ever ran at full speed or full capacity."

By March 1970, Clairtone was sold to the Government of Nova Scotia and came under new management. At this time it began to offer cheaper products including the world's smallest transistor radio, the "Mini Hi-Fi". The company hemorrhaged money to the amount of $19 million that year, losses that were absorbed by the province. Clairtone's stock was de-listed from the Toronto Stock Exchange in 1971, and the company finally closed in 1972. The assets were sold but the company was not officially dissolved until 1979. Over the period of its investment the Government of Nova Scotia lost approximately $25 million, considerably more in today's money.

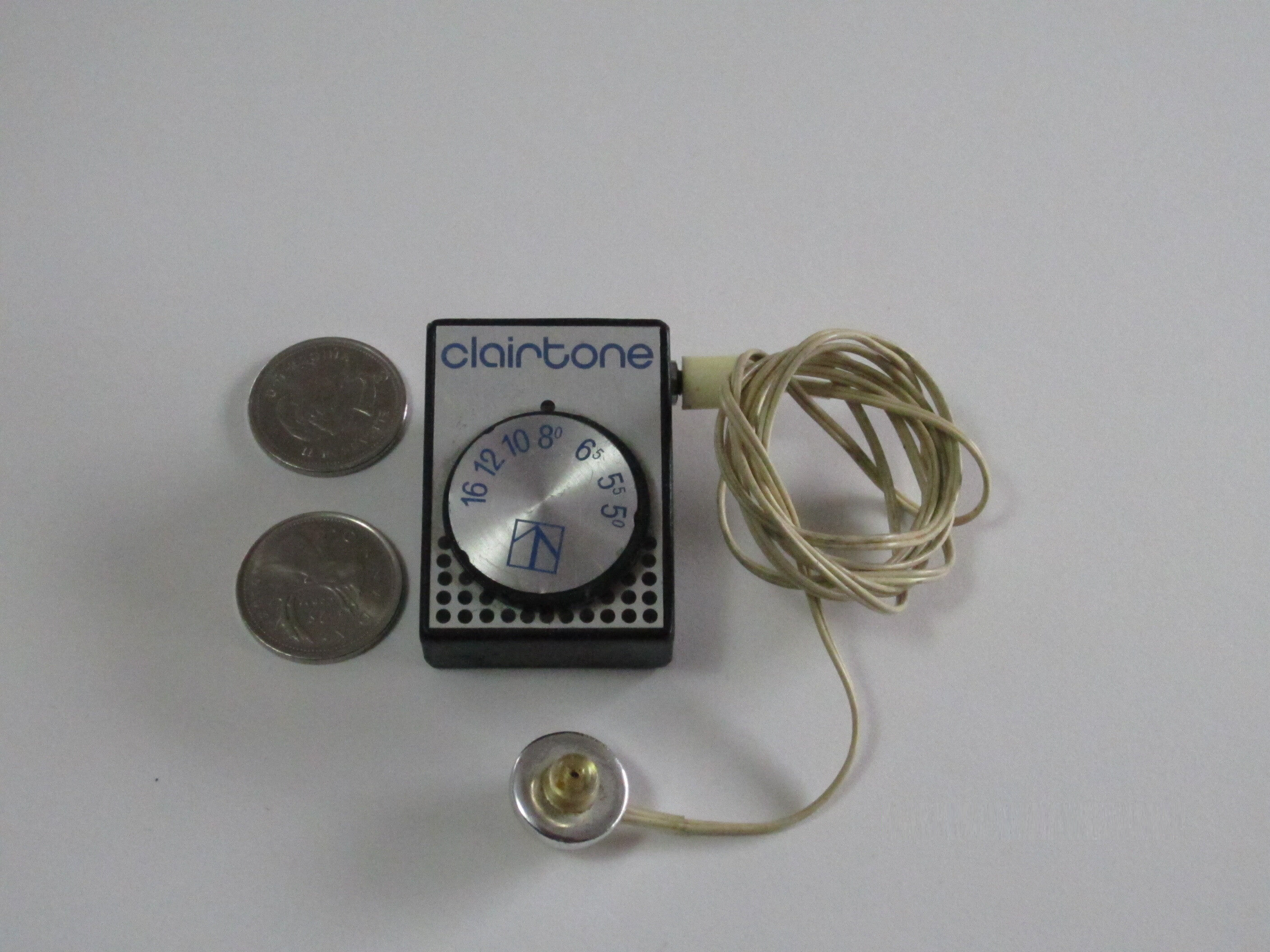
Clairtone Mini Hifi from 1970; it is a copy of the Sinclair Micromatic.
