= Trizec Properties =

Real estate investment trust

Trizec Properties, Inc.
- Type: Real estate investment trust
- Founded: 1960; 66 years ago
- Defunct: October 6, 2006; 20 years ago
- Fate: Acquired by Brookfield Properties and the Blackstone Group
- Successors: Brookfield Properties; GGP (as of 2026); Unibail-Rodamco-Westfield
- Headquarters: Chicago, Illinois

Trizec Properties, Inc., previously known as TrizecHahn Corporation, was a real estate investment trust headquartered in Chicago, Illinois. It was originally a Canadian company. The name is derived from the initials of the three groups (Tri) that formed Trizec Properties Ltd: Zeckendorf, Eagle Star, and Covent Gardens.

In 1994, it was acquired by Peter Munk and in October 2006, it was acquired by Brookfield Properties and the Blackstone Group.

== History ==
Trizec was founded in 1960 by William Zeckendorf with British associates recapitalize the Place Ville Marie development in Montreal.

In the 1970s, the Toronto branch of the Bronfman family acquired a 50.1% controlling interest in Trizec through its holding company, Edper Investments. The Bronfmans were also owners of Carena Properties, successor to the Canadian Arena Company. In the 1980s, Trizec acquired the Hahn Company. The Bronfman family hired Harold Milavsky to lead Trizec as Chairman and CEO for nearly 20 years. Harold was instrumental in the tremendous growth of Trizec during these years, making it one of the largest real estate companies in North America in the 1980s.

Trizec had an immense portfolio of shopping centres, including but not limited to, Yorkdale Shopping Centre, Scarborough Town Centre, as well as Markham Place (The Shops on Steeles and 404). Trizec subsequently sold off Markham Place to Bramalea in 1986.

In 1984, Trizec acquired a controlling interest in Toronto-based property developer Bramalea Ltd. After adding $5 billion in debt to finance rapid expansion during the 1980s property boom, Bramalea collapsed in the early 1990s, and in 1995, its U.S. subsidiary went bankrupt in the largest bankruptcy of a U.S. house developer. With restructuring of Trizec, Edper's equity was reduced to a nominal amount.

In 1994, Trizec Corporation was acquired by Peter Munk's Horsham Corporation.

It moved its headquarters from Calgary to Toronto. Horsham Corporation and Trizec Corporation were amalgamated in 1996 to form TrizecHahn Corporation.

In 1997, it acquired a controlling interest in the Sears Tower (now the Willis Tower) in Chicago for $70 million with payment of an additional $40 million for a garage next door. It also acquired a portfolio of assets from The JBG Companies for $560 million.

In November 1998, the company sold a portfolio of shopping malls, including Westfield Santa Anita to Westfield Group for $1.4 billion. Sonne malls in the U.S. were sold to the Rouse Company.

In 1999, the company acquired 1 New York Plaza for $390 million from Chase Manhattan Bank.

By early 2000, 80% of TrizecHahn's revenues was from the United States and the company moved its headquarters to Chicago and sold all holdings it held in Canada, changing its name to Trizec.

In 2001, it sold noncore assets for $417 million.

In April 2002, the company received permission to convert to a public real estate investment trust.

In November 2002, after the September 11 attacks, the company wrote down two-thirds of the $70 million investment it made in 1997 to gain control of the Sears Tower.

In February 2004, the company sold its interest in Hollywood & Highland to CIM Group for $200 million.

In May 2006, the company acquired 13 office properties in Southern California from Arden Realty for $1.63 billion.

In October 2006, Brookfield Properties and the Blackstone Group acquired the company for $8.9 billion.

== Headquarters locations ==
When it was Canada-based, the headquarters in the early 1970s were in Place Ville Marie in Montreal, Quebec. After a first move to Calgary, Alberta, in 1976 by then company president Harold Milavsky, the headquarters were moved again to Toronto, Ontario in 1995, where the headquarters were in the BCE Place. In 2004, the company was headquartered at Suite 4600 of the Willis Tower (formerly Sears Tower, its former property) in the Chicago Loop. It later moved to the Near West Side.
