= Pinchas Freudiger =

Hungarian-Israeli manufacturer (1900–1976)

Pinchas Freudiger פנחס פרוידיגר
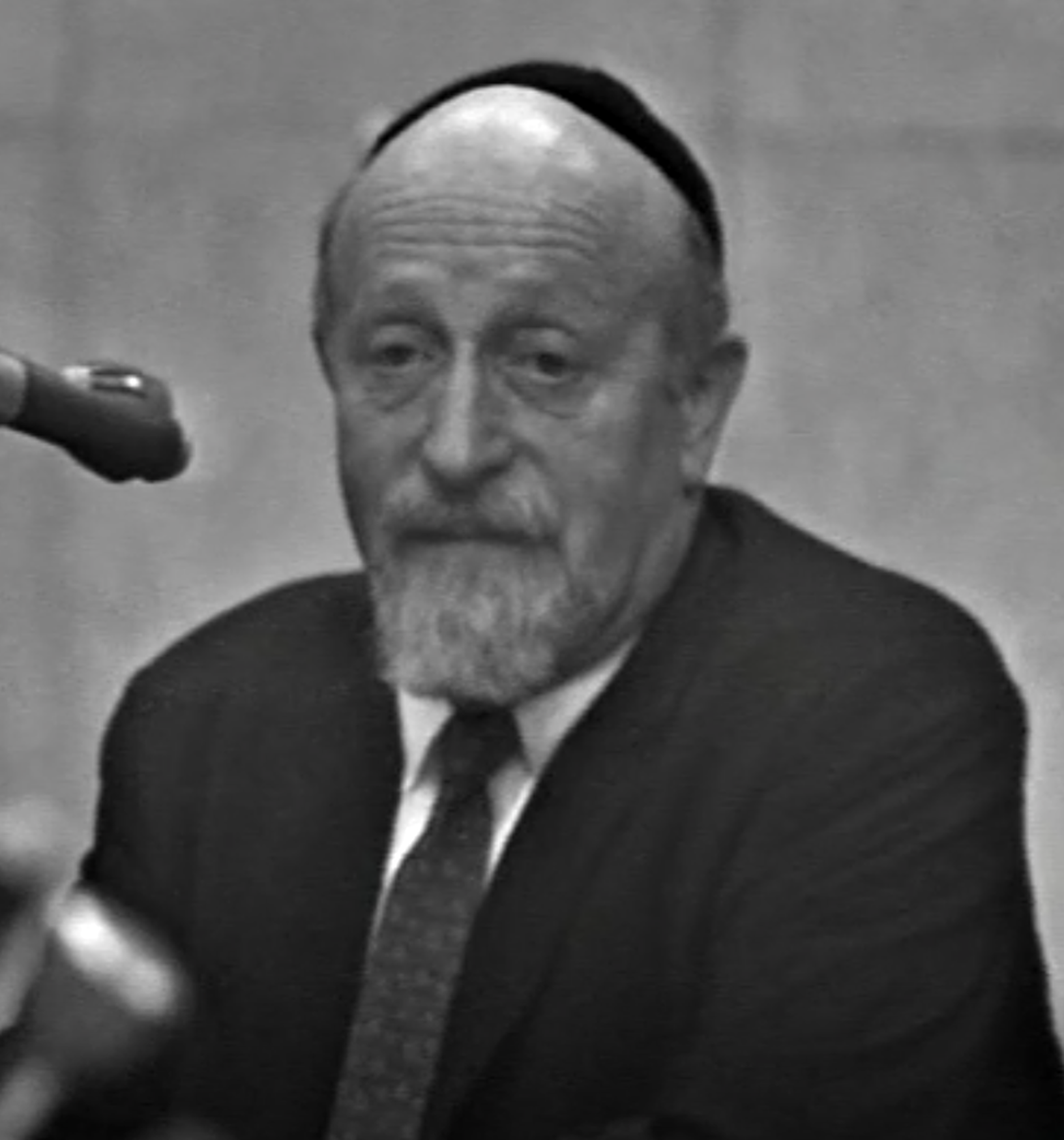
- Freudiger in 1961

Personal life
- Born: Pinchas Freudiger; 1900 Budapest, Austria-Hungary
- Died: 1976 (aged 75–76) Israel

Religious life
- Religion: Judaism
- Denomination: Orthodox

Jewish leader
- Position: President
- Synagogue: Kazinczy Street Synagogue
- Organisation: Hungary's Orthodox Community

Pinchas Freudiger (Hebrew: פנחס פרוידיגר; also Fülöp Freudiger, Philip von Freudiger; 1900 – 1976) was a Hungarian-Israeli manufacturer and Jewish community leader.

== Life ==
Pinchas Freudiger was the son of Abraham Freudiger (1868-1939). His grandfather, textile manufacturer Mózes Freudiger (1833-1911), helped found the Orthodox Jewish community in Budapest and was elevated to noble status. Pinchas Freudiger studied and entered the family business.

He was a member of the Orthodox Jewish council in Budapest, succeeding his father as council chairman upon his father’s death in 1939.

== Holocaust ==
Starting in 1938, the authoritarian Horthy regime of Hungary tightened antisemitic laws enacted to isolate Jews.

After the German invasion of Poland in 1939, thousands of Polish Jews fled to Hungary. Freudiger and others created support organizations to aid them. Meanwhile, many Hungarian Jews continued to believe in their own safety, despite deepening antisemitism in the country.

During Operation Barbarossa in 1941, the Jewish men were not recruited for the Hungarian army, but used in forced labor battalions often stationed behind or at the front.

In 1942, after intense pressure by Rabbi Chaim Michael Dov Weissmandl of the Bratislava Working Group, Hungary's orthodox Jewish community — under Freudiger's leadership — financially aided persecuted Jews in Slovakia, paying a ransom to the Nazis to stop transports of Slovak Jews to Auschwitz. Those transports stopped for two years.

After the German occupation of Hungary on March 19, 1944, Freudiger and Samu Stern were appointed by the Germans as representatives of the orthodox and Neologue Jewish communities on the Jewish Council (Judenrat, Zsidó tanács) in Budapest. The Jewish Council was among recipients of the Vrba–Wetzler report, also known as the Auschwitz Protocols, the Auschwitz Report. It detailed the atrocities in Auschwitz. Much like Rezső Kasztner (aka Rudolf), members of the Jewish Council failed to publicize the atrocities or warn Hungarian Jews of their impending fate.

== In Israel ==
Freudiger and his family escaped to Palestine via Romania in August 1944 in coordination with high-ranking SS officers Dieter Wisliceny and Hermann Krumey. They warned Freudiger that Adolf Eichmann hated him, partly because of his red beard, and intended to imminently put him on a transport.

He testified at the Eichmann trial in Jerusalem. Hannah Arendt, in her 1963 book 'Eichman and the Holocaust' described Freudiger as "The only witness [at the trial] who had been a prominent member of a Judenrat...". She describes how "during his testimony the only serious incidents in the audience took place; people screamed at the witness in Hungarian and in Yiddish, and the court had to interrupt the session." Freudiger, 'shaken', responds to the audience.

- "There are people here who say they were not told to escape. But fifty per cent of the people who escaped were captured and killed - [Hannah Arendt comments] as compared with ninety-nine percent, for those who did not escape."
- "Where could they have gone to? Where could they have fled?' - [Hannah Arendt comments] but he himself fled, to Rumania, because he was rich and Wisliceny helped him."
- "What could we have done? What could we have done?' And the only response to this came from the presiding judge: 'I do not think this is an answer to the question' - a question raised by the gallery but not by the court."

Hannah Arendt is highly critical of Jewish leaders who co-operated with the Nazis and mentions Freudiger again in this context.

"Wherever Jews lived, there were recognized Jewish leaders, and this leadership, almost without exception, cooperated in one way or another, for one reason or another, with the Nazis. The whole truth was that if the Jewish people had really been unorganized and leaderless, there would have been chaos and plenty of misery but the total number of victims would hardly have been between four and a half and six million people. (According to Freudiger's calculations about half of them could have saved themselves if they had not followed the instructions of the Jewish Councils)."
