= Munak, Khuzestan =

Munak مونك
- Village
- Location within Iran
- Coordinates: 31°43′57″N 50°21′19″E
- Country: Iran
- Province: Khuzestan
- County: Izeh
- Bakhsh: Dehdez
- Rural District: Dehdez

Population (2006)
  - Total: 79
- Time zone: UTC+3:30 (IRST)
  - Summer (DST): UTC+4:30 (IRDT)

Munak (Persian: مونك, also Romanized as Mūnak, Moonak, and Mūnk) is a village in Dehdez Rural District, Dehdez District, Izeh County, Khuzestan Province, Iran. At the 2006 census, its population was 79, in 12 families.
