= Munak, Lorestan =

Munak مونك
- Village
- Location within Iran
- Coordinates: 33°16′43″N 48°43′17″E
- Country: Iran
- Province: Lorestan
- County: Khorramabad
- Bakhsh: Papi
- Rural District: Gerit

Population (2006)
  - Total: 107
- Time zone: UTC+3:30 (IRST)
  - Summer (DST): UTC+4:30 (IRDT)

Munak (Persian: مونك, also Romanized as Mūnak) is a village in Gerit Rural District, Papi District, Khorramabad County, Lorestan Province, Iran. At the 2006 census, its population was 107, in 18 families.
