= Industrial Estates Limited =

Canadian corporation

Industrial Estates Limited (IEL) was a Crown corporation established by the Government of Nova Scotia in 1957.

IEL stemmed from the Voluntary Planning Act, instituted by Premier Robert Stanfield's government in the same year. The first president of IEL, Frank Sobey, was paid an honorary salary of $1/year and was instrumental in attracting new companies to the province throughout the 1960s.

IEL began with a $23 million start-up investment from the government and received a mandate to build industrial parks and lease space to companies, though through an aggressive pursuit of outside investment. IEL quickly began building and financing plants for companies that were willing to move to the province. By 1968, 60 firms had benefited from the program, producing 10,000 new jobs and $40 million in provincial revenue.

Some of these companies included:

- Stora Kopparbergs Bergslags AB of Sweden, which built a large integrated pulp and finished paper mill in Point Tupper.
- Michelin of France, which eventually built three tire manufacturing plants in Granton, followed by Bridgewater and Waterville.
- Volvo Personvagnar AB of Sweden, which built the only Volvo car assembly plant in North America in Dartmouth, which later moved to Halifax (see: Volvo Halifax Assembly)
- Scott Paper Company of the United States, which built a kraft pulp mill in Abercrombie.
- Clairtone a Canadian consumer electronics company

IEL was at its zenith during the 1960s as it played an important part in modernizing and diversifying the province's economy. Its influence declined significantly in the 1970s with the increasing role of the federal government in economic development through the Department of Regional Industrial Expansion and its successors.
