= Marc-David Munk =

American physician executive (born 1973)

Marc-David Munk (born 1973) is an American and Canadian physician, writer and healthcare executive who, according to the Advisory Board, a US healthcare consultancy, has "a reputation as an innovator." He is a palliative medicine physician at Massachusetts General Hospital and Harvard Medical School, in Boston.

== Executive Career ==
Munk began his career as an academic emergency medicine physician at UPMC, eventually becoming an associate professor, executive medical director and State EMS medical director at the University of New Mexico. He became a clinician executive for large risk-bearing physician groups; in 2014 he become VP, then Chief Medical Officer at Iora Health, a Boston-based primary care company that was highlighted by the New York Times and Wall Street Journal for its innovative and effective care model. Iora was later sold, in 2021, for an estimated $2.1B. A year later it was re-sold to Amazon as part of an estimated $3.9B healthcare acquisition.

Business Insider in 2018 noted, "Munk led the health care system's care model and care delivery at practices across seven states. During his tenure, Munk helped restructure Iora Health's model of care, including integrated behavioral health.

In 2012, a cover story in Health Leaders Magazine identified Munk as an expert in innovation to support capitated/ value based payment models. The article notes:

"[Innovation] comes at a lower cost for us," Munk says. "And it's something that we would find difficult to bill for in a FFS environment...these kinds of things improve the care that we can deliver to patients... Everybody benefits when we get a little more intelligent about how to spend those dollars."

Munk subsequently served as the Chief Medical Officer for Clinics and Retail Pharmacy at CVS Health, a large American pharmacy, retailer and healthcare insurer.

== Author ==
Urgent Calls from Distant Places
- Urgent Calls from Distant Places
- Author: Marc-David Munk
- Country: United States
- Language: English
- Genre: Memoir, Non-fiction
- Publisher: HarperOne/ HarperCollins (Jan. 2027)
- Media type: Print (hardcover and paperback), audiobook, e-book
- Website: mdmunk.com

Munk is the author of Urgent Calls From Distant Places. The collection of medical essays is based on Munk's work as an emergency flight surgeon with Amref Health Africa Flying Doctors, in East Africa. The book will be published by the HarperOne imprint of HarperCollins publishers in January 2027.

The book has received mostly positive reviews: Kirkus Reviews called it "an enthralling portrait of high-wire emergency care performed under the most trying circumstances..."

== Education ==
Munk received his B.A. in liberal arts from Colgate University, a Master of Public Health degree in epidemiology from Boston University, and an MD degree from Philadelphia's Jefferson Medical College. He completed a residency in emergency medicine and fellowship in global health at University of Pittsburgh Medical Center and later earned a Diploma in Tropical Medicine and Hygiene. He completed a fellowship in palliative medicine at Tufts Medical Center. In 2012 he earned a Master of Science degree in healthcare management from Harvard T.H. Chan School of Public Health.

== Other work ==
From 2017- 2020 Munk was an Entrepreneur in Residence at the Harvard Innovation Labs, in Boston.

Munk was among the first doctors to describe Pine Mouth Syndrome, an unusual pine-nut related toxidrome. This work was referenced by NPR among other news sources.

He is a member of the Boards of Amref Health Africa in Canada and the Carlin Foundation.
