= Nina Munk =

Canadian-American journalist and non-fiction author

Nina Munk (born 1967) is a Canadian-American journalist and non-fiction author. She is the author or co-author of four books, including The Idealist: Jeffrey Sachs and the Quest to End Poverty and Fools Rush In: Jerry Levin, Steve Case, and the Unmaking of Time Warner. She is also the editor of the critical English translation of How It Happened: Documenting the Tragedy of Hungarian Jewry, an influential account of the Holocaust in Hungary written by Ernő Munkácsi in 1947. According to Publishers Marketplace, Munk is working on a new book for Alfred A. Knopf titled In My Dreams, We Are Together about "her family in Hungary during the Holocaust".

== Early and personal life ==
Munk was born in Canada to the entrepreneur and philanthropist Peter Munk and University of Toronto professor Linda Munk. She spent her childhood in Switzerland's Berner Oberland before moving to Toronto for high school. She received a B.A. in comparative literature from Smith College, an M.A. in French literature and language from Middlebury College, and an M.S. with honors from Columbia University Graduate School of Journalism where she was awarded the Philip Greer Memorial Scholarship for outstanding business and financial journalism. Munk is married to the artist Peter Soriano, with whom she owned a townhouse in New York City's East Village for many years. The couple have three children.

== Career ==
Munk's work has appeared in Vanity Fair, The Atlantic, The New York Times, The New York Times Magazine, The New Yorker, Forbes, and Fortune. Before joining Vanity Fair as a contributing editor, she was a senior writer at Fortune and a senior editor at Forbes. She launched her career in journalism as an intern at Paris Passion, an English-language magazine in France.

Among other honors, Munk has won three Business Journalist of the Year Awards and three Front Page Awards. Her article "Rich Harvard, Poor Harvard," published in Vanity Fair, was nominated for a Gerald Loeb Award and included in two published collections, The Great Hangover: 21 Tales of the New Recession from the Pages of Vanity Fair and Schools for Scandal: The Inside Dramas at 16 of America's Most Elite Campuses.

In 2020–2021, Munk was the John and Constance Birkelund Fellow at the New York Public Library's Cullman Center for Scholars and Writers.

== Books ==
=== In My Dreams, We Are Together ===
As a Fellow at the Cullman Center, Munk began working on "a book of narrative nonfiction set against the backdrop of the Holocaust in Hungary." The forthcoming book about her family has since been purchased by Knopf in the U.S. and Faber and Faber in the U.K., among other publishers.

In an interview, Munk stated that the idea for the book came to her as her father was dying and she began cataloging the family's archives: "I understood that this is not a story just about my family; it’s a story about countless Hungarian Jewish families.... It was part of a long process of trying to decide what responsibility you have, as the caretaker of these archives, to make sure the story stays alive. What responsibility do you have to history, to future generations, to scholars?"

=== The Idealist: Jeffrey Sachs and the Quest to End Poverty ===
Munk's 2013 book The Idealist: Jeffrey Sachs and the Quest to End Poverty received critical acclaim and a great deal of attention for its exploration of our "well-intentioned but ultimately naive theories about ending poverty in Africa," to quote Publishers Weekly. Even before it was published, the book was the subject of Joe Nocera's New York Times column in which he noted that Munk's reporting on the controversial and ill-fated Millennium Villages Project "caused her to become disillusioned, and humbled, by the difficulties that any Western aid effort is likely to encounter."

The Idealist was named a finalist for the National Business Book Award and the 2013 Governor General's Awards, and longlisted for the Lionel Gelber Prize. It was selected as a "Book of the Year" by The Spectator, Forbes, Bloomberg, and Amazon.ca, and received overwhelmingly positive reviews. In his review, Bill Gates remarked: "I've told everyone at our foundation that I think it is worth taking the time to read it. It's a valuable—and, at times, heartbreaking—cautionary tale." Foreign Policy magazine recognized The Idealist with a 2013 Albie Award, remarking: "Writing accessibly about development economics is a high-wire act, but Munk accomplishes it brilliantly." In the Wall Street Journal, James Traub cited Munk's "impressive persistence, unflagging empathy and journalistic derring-do." The economist William Easterly, reviewing the book for Barron's, called it "one of the most readable and evocative accounts of foreign aid ever written" while Howard W. French described it as "a devastating portrait of hubris and its consequences."

However, some reviewers have argued that Munk's portrayal of Sachs was overly critical. On his WNYC radio show, Brian Lehrer suggested that Munk overreached when she concluded that foreign aid has often caused more harm than good.

=== Fools Rush In: Jerry Levin, Steve Case, and the Unmaking of AOL Time Warner ===
Munk's 2004 book about the merger of AOL and Time Warner, Fools Rush In: Jerry Levin, Steve Case, and the Unmaking of AOL Time Warner, was about the ill-fated deal that came to be known as "the worst merger in corporate history" and the "poster child for the excesses of the dotcom bubble." Munk was reported to have received a $500,000 advance from HarperCollins for the book.

The New York Times Review of Books called Fools Rush In "the best" of numerous books published on the subject of AOL Time Warner, noting Munk's "exemplary reporting" and "lively, lucid writing." In his column, David Carr wrote: "Of all the journalists who wrote obits for the dot-com mania, few did it with the precision and quiet glee of Nina Munk." The book continues to be cited as "a cautionary tale on New Media’s last revolution," according to MSNBC's Joe Scarborough.

=== The Art of Clairtone: The Making of Design Icon, 1958-1971 ===
In 2008, Munk co-wrote (with curator Rachel Gotlieb) The Art of Clairtone: The Making of Design Icon, a coffee-table book about the celebrated Canadian stereo manufacturer Clairtone Sound Corporation, a company co-founded by her father in 1958. Archival photographs, documents, and artifacts gathered for and used in The Art of Clairtone were displayed in an exhibition about Clairtone at the Design Exchange museum in 2008.

In 2023, the filmmaker Ron Mann announced that he is working on a feature-length documentary about Clairtone based on Munk's book. The forthcoming film features Munk as narrator.

== Other projects ==
=== How It Happened: Documenting the Tragedy of Hungarian Jewry ===
In 2018, Munk served as editor of the first English translation of How It Happened: Documenting the Tragedy of Hungarian Jewry, published by McGill-Queen's University Press, translated from Hungarian by Péter Balikó Lengyel, and annotated by the historians László Csősz and Ferenc Laczó.

Written by Munk's ancestor Ernő Munkácsi and originally published in 1947, How It Happened is an early first-hand account of Nazi Germany's occupation of Hungary, describing the Jewish community's struggle for survival in 1944, when, in a matter of weeks, 437,000 Hungarian Jews were deported to Auschwitz. In her review for History (journal), Caroline Mezger argued that, beyond its value as a primary source, How It Happened "represents a critical, multilayered historiographical attempt to grapple with some of the Holocaust’s key questions of culpability, responsibility and agency."

=== Urbanhound ===
In 2000, as a sideline to her journalism career, Munk founded UrbanHound.com, a website for dog owners. The website led to two spin-off books: Urbanhound: The New York City Dog's Ultimate Survival Guide, co-authored by Munk and Nadia Zonis in 2001; and The Complete Healthy Dog Handbook, written by veterinarian Betsy Brevitz in 2009. But while Urbanhound was a critical success, Munk conceded to the New York Times that it never made much money. In November 2009, FetchDog, an e-commerce and catalog company based in Maine, acquired UrbanHound.com from Munk for an undisclosed sum.
