= Ernő Munkácsi =

Hungarian jurist and writer

- Born: 1896
- Died: 1950 (aged 53–54)

Ernő Munkácsi (7 August 1896 – 1 September 1950) was a Hungarian jurist and writer, general counsel of the Israelite Congregation of Pest, and Director of the Hungarian Jewish Museum. In 1944, during the Nazi occupation of Hungary, he was forced by the Nazis, along with other leaders of Budapest's Jewish community, to serve as secretary for the Hungarian Jewish Council or Judenrat.

Born in what is today Panticeu, Romania — at the time Páncélcseh, Austria-Hungary — Ernő Munkácsi was a son of the distinguished Hungarian linguist and ethnographer Bernát Munkácsi (1860–1937) and grandson of the Hebrew memoirist Me’ir (Adolf) Munk (1830–1907). He was also a first cousin once removed of the Hungarian-born Canadian entrepreneur and philanthropist Peter Munk.

Munkácsi is best known today for his 1947 memoir Hogyan történt?, published in English by McGill-Queen's University Press as How It Happened: Documenting the Tragedy of Hungarian Jewry, an influential account of the Holocaust in Hungary that has been widely cited by such leading scholars as Randolph L. Braham. A reviewer of the English translation states, "Munkácsi writes dispassionately at first, describing life as a proud 'Magyar of the Israelite faith' before the aftermath of World War I ushered in a cascade of repressive anti-Jewish laws. His tone shifts when describing his untenable council assignments. It is at times apologetic, regretful, and introspective. This is an increasingly anguished memoir by someone whose faith in law and humanity was broken."

In the new critical edition of Munkácsi's book, his descendant Nina Munk writes in the preface that "to read How It Happened is to understand that the Budapest-based Judenrat, an administrative body established by the SS immediately after the invasion of Hungary in March 1944, inadvertently facilitated the Nazis’ 'wholesale extermination of Hungarian Jews' (Ernő's words). Even today, this is a deeply unsettling, controversial topic.[...] Already in the immediate aftermath of the war [Munkácsi] and other members of the Judenrat were confronted by intense hostility and outrage from fellow survivors, many of whom had lost their whole family and community to the gas chambers. Why didn't the Judenrat do more to save their people? How did the Judenrat and their families manage to emerge largely unscathed from the war even while more than 400,000 Hungarian Jews were murdered?"
