= Bramalea (company) =

Canadian real estate developer

Bramalea Limited, founded in 1957 as Bramalea Consolidated Developments Ltd., was a Canadian real estate developer best known for its development of the town of Bramalea (Canada's first satellite city) which would later become part of Brampton, Ontario. The company name Bramalea was formed by combining the names of local towns Brampton and Malton with "lea", the Old English word for a meadow.

The bulk of the new company's land holdings were purchased from Bayton Holdings Ltd. in 1958 and 1959, at a cost of $1.18 million. Bramalea was first listed on the Toronto Stock Exchange in August 1960, and over the next five years, the company acquired a number of properties and property development companies. In June 1976, the company's name was shortened from Bramalea Consolidated Developments Ltd. to Bramalea Ltd. By 1988, Bramalea's property portfolio had reached 40 million square feet of industrial, commercial, and retail space, in addition to its extensive housing and land banks. The company declared bankruptcy in 1995 as a result of a heavy debt load accumulated during the early 1990s recession. At the time of its bankruptcy, it owned office properties across North America in such markets as Toronto, Dallas, and Oakland, in addition to shopping mall properties held through its wholly owned subsidiary Trilea Centres, including Unicity Mall in Winnipeg, Yorkdale Shopping Centre in North York, and Scarborough Town Centre.
