= Canada (disambiguation) =

Canada is a country in North America.

Canada may also refer to:

== Arts and entertainment ==
=== Music ===
- Canada (band), an American indie folk-pop music group
- Canada, a 1992 album by Barb Jungr and Michael Parker
- "Canada" (song) or "Ca-na-da", a 1967 song to celebrate Canada's centennial
- "Canada", a 2002 song by Low
- "Canada", a 1976 song by Pilot
- "Canada", a song by Violent Soho from the 2020 album Everything Is A-OK
- "Canada", a song by Lauv and Alessia Cara from the 2020 album How I'm Feeling
- "Canada", a song by Wallows from the 2024 album Model
- "C-A-N-A-D-A", a song by Raffi from the 1994 album Bananaphone

=== Other uses in arts and entertainment ===
- Canada (novel), by Richard Ford, 2012
- Canada, a Hetalia: Axis Powers character

== Businesses and organisations ==
- Canada (company), a Spanish creative production company
- Canada Company, a former British land development company
- Company of One Hundred Associates, or Compagnie du Canada, a former French trading and colonization company

== People ==
- Canada (surname), including a list of people with the name
- Canada Lee (1907–1952), American boxer and actor
- Canadá (footballer) (born 2004), Tiago Coimbra, Canadian soccer player

== Places ==
=== Canada (historical) ===
- Canada (New France), a French colony
- The Canadas, the collective name for the British colonies of Lower Canada and Upper Canada
- Province of Canada, a British colony
- Republic of Canada, a short-lived rebellious entity

=== United States ===
- Canada, Kansas, United States
- Canada, Kentucky, United States

=== United Kingdom ===
- Canada, Wellow, Hampshire, England

=== Elsewhere ===
- Canada Glacier, Antarctica

== Transportation ==
- Canada (ship), the name of several ships
- 5553 Canada, a British LMS Jubilee Class locomotive
- Canada, a British LB&SCR B4 class locomotive
- LNER Class A4 4489 Dominion of Canada, a British locomotive

== Other uses ==
- Canada (unit), an ancient Portuguese unit of liquid volume

== See also ==
- Canadas (disambiguation)
- Cañada (disambiguation)
- Canada Bay (disambiguation)
- Canada House (disambiguation)
- Canadia (disambiguation)
- Canadian (disambiguation)
- Canadien, or French Canadians
- Canadiana (disambiguation)
- Upper Canada (disambiguation)
- Kanada (disambiguation)
- Kaneda, a Japanese surname
- Kanata (disambiguation)
- Kannada (disambiguation)
- Canada Dock, Liverpool, England
- Canada goose, a bird
- Canada Park, a national park in the West Bank
- Canada Square, London, England
- Canada Square (Toronto), Canada
- Canada Water, London, England
- Kanada warehouses, Auschwitz, in Poland
- Little Canada (term)
- RMS Empress of Canada, several ships
- "O Canada", Canada's national anthem
- Canda, a commune in Italy with a similar name to Canada
