= Cañada =

Cañada may refer to:

== Places ==
=== Argentina ===
- Cañada de Gómez, Santa Fe province
- Cañada Rosquín, Santa Fe province
- La Cañada, Santiago del Estero

=== Mexico ===
- Cañada, Alaquines, San Luis Potosí
- Cañadas de Obregón, Jalisco
- Cañada de la Virgen, Guanajuato, an archaeological site
- Cañada, Guanajuato, Cortazar
- Cañada Region, Oaxaca
- Cañada Morelos Municipality
  - Morelos Cañada
- La Cañada, El Marqués, Querétaro
- La Cañada (Mexicable), an aerial lift station in Ecatepec, Greater Mexico City

=== Spain ===
- Cañada, Alicante
- Cañada de Benatanduz, Aragón
- Cañada de Calatrava, Castilla–La Mancha
- Cañada de Morote, Albacete
- Cañada del Hoyo, Castilla–La Mancha
- Cañada del Provencio, Albacete
- Cañada Juncosa, Castilla–La Mancha
- Cañada Real, Madrid
- Cañada Rosal, Province of Seville
- Cañada Vellida, Aragón
- La Cañada de Verich, Aragón

=== United States ===
- Cañada de los Alamos, New Mexico
- Cañada del Oro, a primary watershed channel in the valley of Tucson, Arizona
- Cañada Gobernadora, a tributary to San Juan Creek in California
- Cañada Verde Creek, a stream in California
- La Cañada Flintridge, California, commonly known as just La Cañada

=== Uruguay ===
- Cañada Nieto, Soriano Department

== Other uses ==
- David Cañada (1975–2016), Spanish cyclist
- Cañada College, in Redwood City, California, U.S.
- La Cañada Observatory, in Ávila, Spain

== See also ==
- Canada (disambiguation)
