= Canara (disambiguation) =

Canara or Kanara is a region in the state of Karnataka, India.

Canara may also refer to these related to the region:

- North Canara, subregion now the Uttara Kannada district of Karnataka, India
- South Canara, subregion, also a former district of British India; now within the Dakshina Kannada and Udupi districts of Karnataka and the Kasaragod district of Kerala
  - South Canara District Central Co-operative Bank, Mangalore, Karnataka, India
  - South Kanara District Chess Association
  - South Kanara (North) Lok Sabha constituency, defunct Indian parliamentary constituency in the former Madras State
  - South Kanara (South) Lok Sabha constituency, defunct Indian parliamentary constituency in the former Madras State
  - South Kanara Islands now Aminidivi, island subgroup in Lakshadweep, India
- Canara pearlspot, species of fish
- Canara Bank, in Bangalore, Karnataka, India
  - Canara HSBC Life Insurance
- Canara College, in Mangalore, Karnataka, India
- Canara Engineering College, in Karnataka, India
- Canara High School, Mangalore, Karnataka, India
- Canara Bank Bangalore Open, Indian tennis tournament

== See also ==
- Karnataka (disambiguation)
- Kannada (disambiguation)
- Carnatic (disambiguation)
- Canarese, former spelling of Kannada, a Dravidian language of Karnataka, India
  - Kannada script or Canarese script, Indic script used to write Kannada
  - Canarese-Telugu script or Telugu-Kannada alphabet, historic script for the language
- Canarese Konkani, dialect of the Indo-Aryan Konkani language spoken in Canara
- Canara, historic name of Ovidiu, Romania
- Canararctia, genus and species of moth
