= List of programs broadcast by History (Canadian TV network) =

This is a list of programs currently and formerly broadcast by Canadian television channel History and its former incarnation as History Television. This list is current as of September 2014.

== Current programming ==
=== Acquired from History ===
- Alone
- American Pickers
- American Restoration
- Biker Battleground Phoenix
- Counting Cars
- The Hunt
- Ice Road Truckers
- Mountain Men
- Pawn Stars
- Pawnography
- Swamp People
- Texas Rising

=== Other programming ===
- Airport: Below Zero
- Auction House
- Black Watch
- BLK, An Origin Story
- Canadian Pickers
- Hardcore Heroes
- History Erased
- Ice Pilots NWT
- Knightfall
- Lost Car Rescue
- Museum Secrets
- Nazi Treasure Hunters
- Restoration Garage
- Six
- Treasures Decoded
- Vikings
- Yukon Gold

== Original films ==
- Cheating Hitler: Surviving the Holocaust
- The Real Inglorious Bastards
- True Story

== Former programming ==
=== 0–9 ===
- 10 Days That Unexpectedly Changed America
- 12 O'Clock High
- 1916 Total War
- 21st Century War Machines

=== A ===
- Aftermath
- Airwars: Fire in the Skies
- America: The Story of the U.S.
- Ancestors In The Attic
- Ancient Aliens
- Ancient Discoveries
- Ancient Weather
- Ancients Behaving Badly
- Anna Leonowens Getting to Know You
- Antiques Roadshow (US)
- Antiques Roadshow FYI (US)
- Around the World in 80 Ways
- Auschwitz: The Forgotten Evidence
- Ax Men

=== B ===
- Band of Brothers
- Barbarians
- Barbarians Rising
- Battle 360°
- Battle of Britain
- Battle of Hood and Bismarck
- The Battle of Jutland
- Battlefield Britain
- Battlefield Detectives
- Battleships
- Beast Legends
- Betrayal
- Beyond the Da Vinci Code
- Big Timber
- Blowdown
- Bomb Hunters
- The Bomber's Dream
- The Bombing War
- Brad Meltzer's Decoded
- Breathing Fire: Battle of the Somme
- Britain AD: King Arthur's Britain

=== C ===
- Canadian Made
- The Canadians
- Carnivàle
- The Charge of the Light Brigade
- Chasing Mummies: The Amazing Adventures of Zahi Hawass
- China Beach
- Churchill: Man of Destiny
- Cities of the Underworld
- Conquest
- Convoy: War of the Atlantic
- Crime Stories

=== D ===
- D-Day: Men and Machines
- D-Day to Victory
- Dambusters Fly Again
- Deadly Arts
- Deadwood
- Death in the Bunker
- Deep Wreck Mysteries
- Devil's Brigade
- Diana: The Night She Died
- Diana's Legacy
- Dispatches from the Front
- Dive Detectives
- Dogfight: Mystery of the Red Baron
- Down East Dickering
- Dual Suspects
- Dust Up

=== E ===
- The Egyptian Job
- Einstein
- Enchanted Summers
- The English Club
- Exhibit A

=== F ===
- Finding the Fallen
- Foyle's War

=== G ===
- Ghost Towns
- Great Canadian Lakes
- The Great Stink
- The Greatest Escapes of History
- Greatest Tank Battles

=== H ===
- Hairy Bikers
- Halifax: The Story of a Bomber
- History Bites
- History Lands
- History's Secrets
- Hitler of the Andes
- Hitler's Britain
- Hitler's Sunken Secret
- Hitler's War on America
- Hitler's Women
- Horizon: King Solomon's Tablet

=== I ===
- Ice Road Truckers: Deadliest Roads
- In Korea
- Inside Lost Worlds
- Inside the Mafia

=== J ===
- JAG
- Japan's Atomic Bomb
- Japan's War in Colour

=== K ===
- The Kennedys

=== L ===
- The Last Dawn
- Life After People
- Lost Battlefields
- The Lost Book of Nostradamus
- Lost Inventions
- Lost Worlds

=== M ===
- MacArthur
- March of the Dinosaurs
- M*A*S*H
- Masterminds
- Moby Dick: The True Story
- MysteryQuest

=== N ===
- Nazi Hunters
- The Nostradamus Effect

=== O ===
- Outlaw Bikers

=== P ===
- The Pacific
- Patton 360
- Pawnathon Canada
- Power & Ice

=== R ===
- The Re-Inventors
- Rodeo: Life on the Circuit

=== S ===
- Secret War Files: The Battle of the Mace
- Storming Juno
- Storm Planets

=== T ===
- Tank Overhaul
- They Built the Railway
- Timeline: Century of Conflict
- TimeChase
- Top Gear USA
- A Town in Africa
- Trashopolis
- A Treasure Ship Tragedy
- True Crime Scene
- Turning Points in History

=== U ===
- Underworld Histories
- Urban Legends

=== V ===
- Vietnam in HD
- Vikings

=== W ===
- Waterlife
- What's in a Name?
- William Shatner's Weird or What?
- World War II in HD
- World War II in HD: The Air War
