= Carnatic =

Carnatic may refer to:

- Carnatic region, Southern India
- Carnatic music, the classical music of Southern India
- Carnatic (ship), the name of several ships
- HMIS Carnatic (J199), a minesweeper of the Royal Indian Navy
- HMS Carnatic, the name of several ships of the Royal Navy

== See also ==
- Karnataka (disambiguation)
- Kannada (disambiguation)
- Canara (disambiguation)
- Carnatic Hall, in Liverpool, England
- Carnatic wars, in India during the 18th century
