= Cannada =

Cannada may be a misspelling of:

- Canada, a country in North America
- Kannada, a Dravidian language of South India

== See also ==
- Canada (disambiguation)
- Kannada (disambiguation)
- Kanada (disambiguation)
