= Kanada =

Kanada may refer to:

- Kaṇāda, the Hindu sage who founded the philosophy of Vaisheshika
- Kanada (family of ragas), a group of ragas in Hindustani music
- Kanada (surname)
- Kanada Station, train station in Fukuoka, Japan
- Canada, a country in North America (as it is spelled in many languages)
- Kanada warehouses, Auschwitz, storage facilities in Auschwitz for looted property
- Kanada, a genus of treehopper

== See also ==
- Canada (disambiguation)
- Kannada (disambiguation)
- Kaneda, a Japanese surname
- Kanata (disambiguation)
- Kanhar (disambiguation)
