= Canadian (disambiguation) =

Canadians are people identified with the country of Canada.

Canadian. Canadians, The Canadian, The Canadians, may also refer to:

- Something of, from, or related to Canada, a country
- Canadian citizens
- Canadian ethnicity
- Canadian cuisine
- Canadian English
- Canadian French

== Geography ==
=== Rivers ===
- Canadian River, United States, the largest tributary of the Arkansas River, in the southwestern United States
- Canadian River (Colorado), United States, a tributary of the North Platte River
- North Canadian River, United States, originating in northeast New Mexico

=== Cities ===
- Canadian, Oklahoma, United States, a town in Pittsburg County
  - Canadian County, Oklahoma, United States
- Canadian, Texas, United States, a city in Hemphill County
- Canadian Lakes, Michigan, United States, an unincorporated community located in Mecosta County
- Canadian, Victoria, 3350 Australia

== Groups, organizations ==
- Canadian Airlines, a defunct airline of Canada
- Sherbrooke Canadians, a minor-league baseball team during the 1946 season
- Carleton Place Canadians, a junior hockey team
- Kingston Canadians, a former junior hockey team
- Vancouver Canadians, current MLB minor league affiliate team (Toronto Blue Jays)

== Arts, entertainment, media ==
- The Canadian (film), a 1926 American silent film
- The Canadians (1959 film), a short film produced by the Canadian government to encourage immigration
- The Canadians (1961 film), a 1961 Western film starring Robert Ryan
- The Canadian (newspaper supplement), a weekly general interest magazine published from 1965 to 1979
- The Canadians (TV series), a 1998 documentary series featuring biographical depictions of famous Canadians

== Transportation ==
- Canadian (canoe), a kind of canoe
- Canadian (NYC train), an international passenger train with service from Chicago to Upper Canada via Detroit (1914–1961)
- SS Canadian, an iron-hulled passenger ship of the Allan Line (launched 1859, sunk 1860)
- The Canadian, a Canadian transcontinental passenger train with service between Toronto and Vancouver (1955–present)

== Other uses ==
- Canadian horse, a breed of horse, an official Canadian animal symbol
- Canadian, a type of bet covering five selections and also known as a "Super Yankee"
- Molson Canadian, a popular brand of beer produced by Molson Coors Brewing Company

== See also ==
- Canada (disambiguation)
- Canadiana (disambiguation)
- Canadien (disambiguation)
