= Empress of Canada =

Empress of Canada may refer to:

- RMS Empress of Canada, several ships by the name from the Canadian Pacific Steamship Company
- MV Empress of Canada (1989), a Toronto Harbour cruise ship

== See also ==
- Queen of Canada
