= Kaneda =

Kaneda (Japanese: 金田 or 兼田) is a Japanese surname. Notable people with the surname include:

== People ==
- Akishige Kaneda (born 1990), football player
- Hiroshi Kaneda (born 1953), astronomer
- Mario Kaneda (born 1976), creator of Girls Bravo
- Masaichi Kaneda (1933–2019), baseball player
- Sekiryo Kaneda (1883–1949), president of Nintendo
- Tomoko Kaneda (born 1973), voice actress, J-pop singer and radio personality

== Fictional characters ==
- Captain Kaneda, a character in the film Sunshine
- Rei Kaneda, a character in the anime series Star Detective Precure!
- Shotaro Kaneda (Akira), a character in the manga series Akira
- Shotaro Kaneda, a character in the manga series Tetsujin 28-go

== See also ==
- Kaneda Castle
- Canada (disambiguation)
- Kanada (disambiguation)
- Kanata (disambiguation)
- Kannada (disambiguation)
