= Kannadanadu =

Kannadanadu may refer to:

- Karnataka, a state in India
- Kannada Nadu Party, a political party in Karnataka, now merged into the Janata Dal

== See also ==
- Kannada (disambiguation)
