= Francos =

Francos is a surname of Spanish origin. Notable people with the surname include:

- Guillermo Francos (born 1950), Argentine politician
- José Francos Rodríguez (1862–1931), Spanish politician and journalist
- María Izaguirre Francos (1952–2025), Mexican politician

== See also ==
- Franco's
