= Karnataka (disambiguation) =

Karnataka is an Indian state.

Karnataka may also refer to:

- Karnataka (band), a British rock band
  - Karnataka (album)
- Karnataka Bank, a banking institution based in Mangaluru, Karnataka
- Karnataka (plant), a genus of flowering plants containing a single species, Karnataka benthamii

== See also ==
- Carnatic (disambiguation)
- Kannada (disambiguation)
- Canara (disambiguation)
- Karnata Kingdom, ancient Indian kingdom
- Karnata Empire or the Vijayanagara Empire, Indian empire
- Karnat dynasty, ancient Indian dynasty
- Karnata dravida, Indian architectural style
- Karnata Bharata Kathamanjari, Kannada-language version of the ancient Indian epic Mahabharata
