= Canadian Falls =

Canadian Falls may refer to:

- Horseshoe Falls, Niagara Falls, Niagara River, Canada; the Canadian portion of Niagara Falls (the U.S. portion being "American Falls")
- Niagara Falls, Niagara River, Canada-USA; sometimes the entire waterfalls is called "Canadian Falls"
- Shoshone Falls, Snake River, Idaho, USA; formerly called "Canadian Falls"

== See also ==
- Canadian (disambiguation)
- Falls (disambiguation)
- Fall (disambiguation)
