= Shrirangia =

Scientific classification
- Kingdom: Plantae
- Clade: Tracheophytes
- Clade: Angiosperms
- Clade: Eudicots
- Clade: Asterids
- Order: Apiales
- Family: Apiaceae
- Genus: Shrirangia; Gosavi, Madhav & Chandore
- Species: S. concanensis

Binomial name
- Shrirangia concanensis Gosavi, Madhav & Chandore

Genus of flowering plants

Shrirangia is a genus of flowering plants in the family Apiaceae. It includes a single species, Shrirangia concanensis, which is endemic to Maharashtra state in western India. It is a slender-stemmed perennial herb, 10–50 cm tall, which grows from a tuberous root.

It is found on low-elevation lateritic plateaus in the Ratnagiri and Sindhudurg districts in the Konkan region of Maharashtra. It grows in the shade of trees and shrubs including Holarrhena pubescens, Breynia retusa, Leea asiatica, Memecylon umbellatum, and Microcos paniculata, often in association with Dioscorea bulbifera, Dipcadi concanense, Flemingia tuberosa, Impatiens minor, Ischaemum sp., Neuracanthus sphaerostachyus, Rostellularia sp., Sida sp., Senecio belgaumensis, and Theriophonum dalzellii.

The genus and species were first described in 2022 by Gosavi, Madhav and Chandore. It has morphological affinities with genus Chamaesium H.Wolff., which is native to the Himalayas, and Karnataka P.K.Mukh. & Constance which is also native to western India. The genus name honors Dr. Shrirang Ramchandra Yadav, an Indian botanist and professor in the Department of Botany at Shivaji University, Kolhapur. The species epithet is derived from the Konkan region of Maharashtra where the species was found.
