= Canadas (disambiguation) =

The Canadas is the collective name for the provinces of Lower Canada and Upper Canada, 1791–1841.

Canadas or Cañadas may also refer to:

== Places ==
- United Canadas, or the Province of Canada, a merger of Upper Canada and Lower Canada, 1841–1867
- Las Cañadas crater, site of Teide, a volcano on Tenerife

== People ==
- Antonio Cañadas (born 1979), Spanish footballer
- Esther Cañadas (born 1977), Spanish actress and model
- Manuel Cañadas (born 1947), footballer from El Salvador

== See also ==
- Canada (disambiguation)
- Cañada (disambiguation)
- Canada goose, Branta canadensis
