= 15th federal electoral district of Puebla =

Federal electoral district of Mexico

Puebla's 15th
- Electoral district of the Chamber of Deputies of Mexico

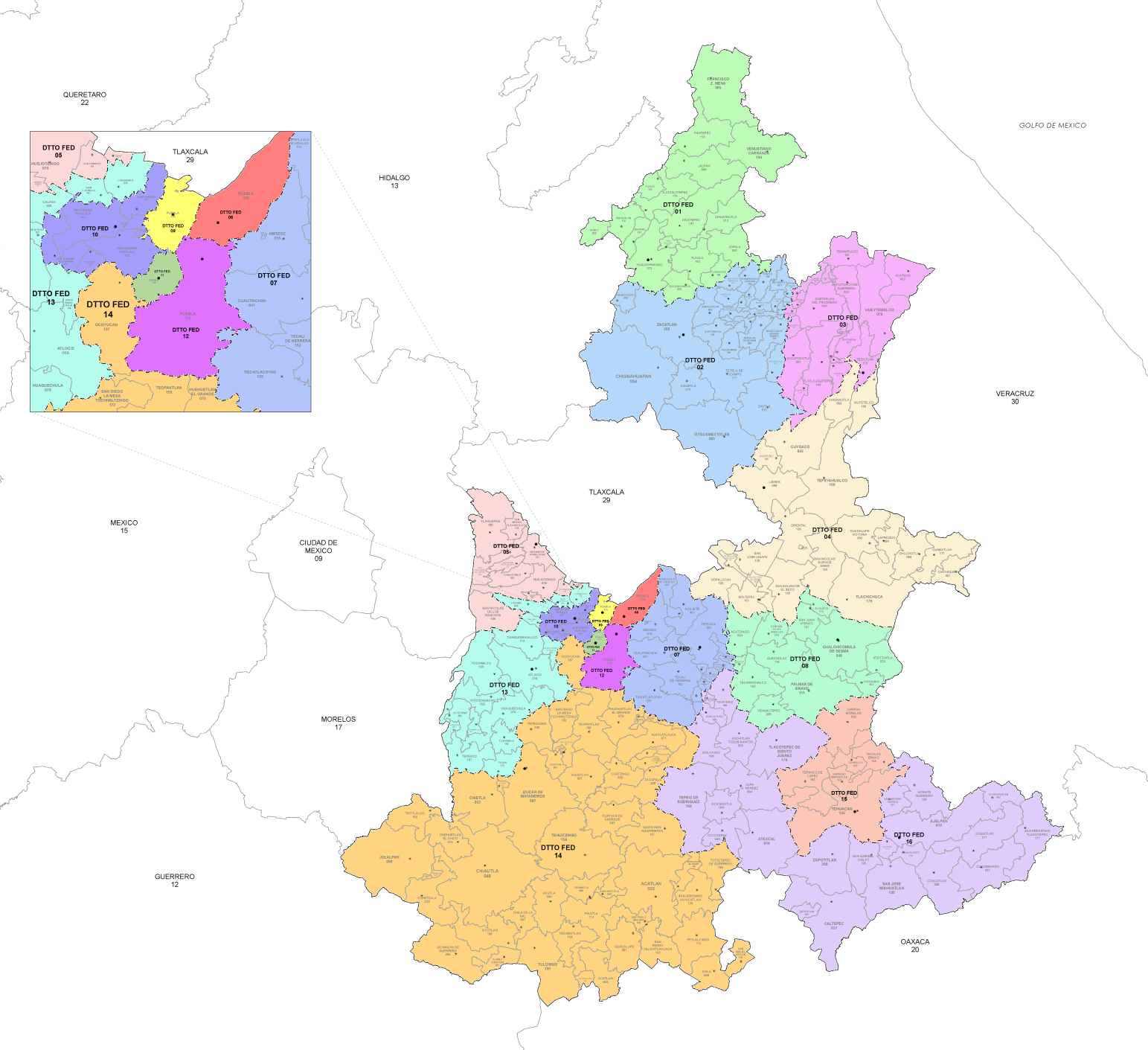
- 15th district since 2023

Incumbent
- Member: Rosario Orozco Caballero
- Party: ▌Morena
- Congress: 66th (2024–2027)

District
- State: Puebla
- Head town: Tehuacán
- Coordinates: 18°28′N 97°23′W
- Covers: Cañada Morelos, Chapulco, Nicolás Bravo, Santiago Miahuatlán, Tehuacán, Tepanco de López
- PR region: Fourth
- Precincts: 119
- Population: 415,593 (2020 census)

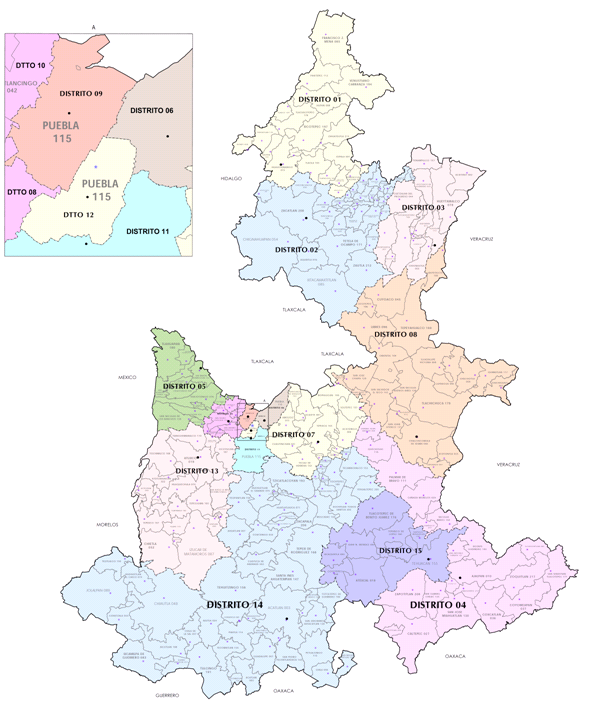
Puebla's districts in 2017–2022

The 15th federal electoral district of Puebla (Spanish: Distrito electoral federal 15 de Puebla) is one of the 300 electoral districts into which Mexico is divided for elections to the federal Chamber of Deputies and one of 16 such districts in the state of Puebla.

It elects one deputy to the lower house of Congress for each three-year legislative session by means of the first-past-the-post system. Votes cast in the district also count towards the calculation of proportional representation ("plurinominal") deputies elected from the fourth region.

Suspended in 1930, (Note: An amendment to Article 52 of the Constitution in 1928 changed the original provision of "one deputy per 60,000 inhabitants" to "one deputy per 100,000"; as a result, the size of the Chamber of Deputies fell from 281 in the 1928 election to 171 in 1934.) Puebla's 15th district was re-established by the Federal Electoral Institute (IFE) in 1996. The restored district returned its first deputy in the 1997 mid-term election

The current member for the district, elected in the 2024 general election, is María del Rosario Orozco Caballero of the National Regeneration Movement (Morena).

== District territory ==
Under the 2023 districting plan adopted by the National Electoral Institute (INE), which is to be used for the 2024, 2027 and 2030 federal elections, Puebla's congressional seat allocation rose from 15 to 16. The 15th district is in Puebla's south-east and covers 119 electoral precincts (secciones electorales) across six of the state's municipalities:

- Cañada Morelos, Chapulco, Nicolás Bravo, Santiago Miahuatlán, Tehuacán and Tepanco de López.

The head town (cabecera distrital), where results from individual polling stations are gathered together and tallied, is the city of Tehuacán. The district reported a population of 415,593 in the 2020 census.

== Previous districting schemes ==
Evolution of electoral district numbers
	1974	1978	1996	2005	2017	2023
Puebla	10	14	15	16	15	16
Chamber of Deputies	196	300				

2017–2022

From 2017 to 2022, when Puebla was assigned 15 congressional seats, the district's head town was at Tehuacán and it covered eight municipalities:
- Atexcal, Coyotepec, Ixcaquixtla, Juan N. Méndez, Santiago Miahuatlán, Tehuacán, Tepanco de López and Tlacotepec de Benito Juárez.

2005–2017

Under the 2005 plan, the district was one of 16 in Puebla. Its head town was at Tehuacán and it covered four municipalities:
- Santiago Miahuatlán, Tehuacán, Tepanco de López and Tlacotepec de Benito Juárez.

1996–2005

From 1978 to 1996, Puebla was allocated 14 seats in Congress. Re-established by the Federal Electoral Institute (IFE) in its 1996 districting plan, the 15th district covered 14 municipalities and had its head town at Tehuacán.

== Deputies returned to Congress ==
(Mexico) National parties
- Current
- PAN
- PRI
- PT
- PVEM
- MC
- Morena
- PAZ
- Somos
- Defunct or local only
- PLM
- PNR
- PRM
- PNM
- PP
- PPS
- PARM
- PFCRN
- CON
- PANAL
- PSD
- PES
- PES
- PRD

Puebla's 15th district
Election	Deputy	Party	Term	Legislature
1916	Leopoldo Vázquez Mellado		1916–1917	Constituent Congress of Querétaro
...
The 15th district was suspended between 1930 and 1997
1997	Ignacio García de la Cadena	Institutional Revolutionary Party	1997–2000	57th Congress
2000	María Luisa Araceli Domínguez Ramírez	Institutional Revolutionary Party	2000–2003	58th Congress
2003	María del Carmen Izaguirre Francos	Institutional Revolutionary Party	2003–2006	59th Congress
2006	René Lezama Aradillas	National Action Party (Mexico)	2006–2009	60th Congress
2009	María del Carmen Izaguirre Francos	Institutional Revolutionary Party	2009–2012	61st Congress
2012	María del Carmen García de Cadena Romero	Institutional Revolutionary Party	2012–2015	62nd Congress
2015	Sergio Emilio Gómez Oliver	National Action Party (Mexico)	2015–2018	63rd Congress
2018	Alejandro Barroso Chávez (Note: Originally elected for Morena, Barroso Chávez switched to the Labour Party on 11 August 2020.)	National Regeneration Movement Labour Party (Mexico)	2018–2021	64th Congress
2021	Araceli Celestino Rosas (Note: Celestino Rosas resigned her seat on 21 February 2024 and was replaced for the remainder of her term by her alternate, Serrano Romero.); Fabiola Serrano Romero	Labour Party (Mexico)	2021–2024; 2024	65th Congress
2024	María del Rosario Orozco Caballero	National Regeneration Movement	2024–2027	66th Congress

== Presidential elections ==
Puebla's 15th district
Election	District won by	Party or coalition	%
2018	Andrés Manuel López Obrador	Juntos Haremos Historia	67.8484
2024	Claudia Sheinbaum Pardo	Sigamos Haciendo Historia	74.5421
