= María García Romero =

Mexican politician

María del Carmen García de la Cadena Romero
- Born: 31 October 1968 (age 57); Tehuacán, Puebla, Mexico
- Occupation: Politician
- Political party: PRI

María del Carmen García de la Cadena Romero (born 31 October 1968) is a Mexican politician affiliated with the Institutional Revolutionary Party (PRI).

In the 2012 general election she was elected to the Chamber of Deputies to represent Puebla's 15th district during the 62nd session of Congress.

As a federal deputy with a history of supporting public institutions, García promoted well-being, development and security. She succeeded in partnering with and influencing government and business leaders to identify and prioritize key party initiatives.

Some of her achievements include participation in the ordinary commissions of Foreign Relations, Public Security and Housing where agreements were developed for the fight against domestic violence, the rights of young people and protection of children against sexual exploitation and abuse, all of this was achieved through arduous planning and negotiation.

== Participation and memberships ==
·Secretariat of the Ordinary Commission on Foreign Relations

·Secretariat of the Ordinary Public Security Commission

·Member of the Ordinary Housing Commission

·Member of the Monitoring Commission for the Evaluations of the Concurrent Special Program

·Member of the Evaluation Committee of the Child Development Center "CENDI"

·Member of the Management and Complaints Committee

·Vice Coordinator in Social Management
