= Kanhar =

Kanhar may refer to:

- Kanhar, Iran, a village in Kermanshah Province, Iran
- Kanhar River, in Chhattisgarh, India
- Kanada (family of ragas), ragas in Hindustani classical music (North Indian classical music)

== See also ==
- Kanada (disambiguation)
