= Carnatic (ship) =

Several vessels have been named Carnatic, for the Carnatic region of India.

- Carnatic (1770 ship) was launched in 1770, as an East Indiaman belonging to the French East India Company. A British privateer captured her in 1778. She became a transport. She was wrecked in 1781.
- Carnatic (1787 EIC ship) was launched in 1787. She made six voyages as an East Indiaman for the British East India Company (EIC). She was sold for breaking up in 1802.
- Carnatic (1808 EIC ship) made six voyages for the EIC before she was broken up in 1820.
- Carnatic (1858 HBC vessel), a vessel formerly in service with the Hudson's Bay Company
- Carnatic (1867 ship), of 871 tons burthen, was launched at Sunderland in 1867. In the 1870s she made three voyages carrying migrants from the United Kingdom to New Zealand. In 1883 she became waterlogged in a storm and her crew abandoned her Port Elizabeth, South Africa.
- SS Carnatic, a P&O steamer with an early compound engine. Launched in 1862, wrecked in 1869.

== In fiction ==
In Jules Verne's 1872 novel, Around the World in Eighty Days, Phileas Fogg intends to take a steamer named Carnatic to travel from Hong Kong to Yokohama, but misses it. His valet, Passepartout, catches the ship, however.

== See also ==
- HMS Carnatic – any one of three vessels of the British Royal Navy
- HMIS Carnatic (J199) – Bangor-class minesweeper built for the Royal Navy, but transferred to the Royal Indian Navy (RIN) during the Second World War
