= Canadia =

Canadia may refer to:

- Canadia (annelid), an extinct genus
- Canadia Group, a conglomerate in Cambodia
- Canadia Bank, a bank in Cambodia
- Canadia: 2056, a radio comedy series
- "Canadia", a song by MC Frontalot from the 2008 album Final Boss

== See also ==
- Canada (disambiguation)
- Candida (disambiguation)
