= Canadien (disambiguation) =

A Canadien or French Canadian is a Canadian of French descent and language.

Canadiens, Canadien, Canadienne or Canadiennes, may also refer to:

== Sports teams ==
- Montreal Canadiens, Canadian professional ice hockey team (founded 1910)
- Les Canadiens, name of the Montreal Canadiens in their first season, 1910
- Hull-Ottawa Canadiens, Canadian semi-professional ice hockey franchise (1959–1963)
- Lakeshore Canadiens, Canadian junior ice hockey team (founded 1978 as the Belle River Canadiens, renamed 2014)
- Montreal Junior Canadiens, Canadian junior ice hockey team (1933–1972)
- Sherbrooke Canadiens, Canadian professional ice hockey team (1984–1990)
- St. Boniface Canadiens, Canadian junior ice hockey team, formerly Winnipeg Canadiens and later Winnipeg Warriors (1952–1964)
- St. Paul Canadiens, Canadian junior ice hockey team (founded 1991)
- Toronto Jr. Canadiens, Canadian junior ice hockey team (founded 1972)
- Les Canadiennes de Montreal, Canadian women's ice hockey team

== Political parties ==
- Parti canadien, early 19th-century Canadian political party
- Parti canadien (1942), Canadian political party (1942 – c. 1944)

== Other uses ==
- Canadien (ice hockey), a brand of ice hockey equipment
- Canadienne cattle, breed of cattle
- Le Canadien, short-lived Canadian newspaper (1806–1810)
- La Canadienne, early name for the Canadian Women's Open golf tournament

== See also ==
- Canadian (disambiguation)
- Route Transcanadienne
