= Upper Canada (disambiguation) =

Upper Canada was a former British colony in North America.

Upper Canada may also refer to:

- Bank of Upper Canada, a Canadian bank that existed from 1821 to 1866
- Upper Canada Brewing Company, a brewery in Guelph, Ontario, Canada
- Upper Canada District School Board, a school board in eastern Ontario, Canada
- Upper Canada College, a private school in Toronto, Ontario, Canada
- Upper Canada Mall, a shopping mall in Newmarket, Ontario, Canada
- Upper Canada Village, a heritage park in Morrisburg, Ontario, Canada
- Upper Canada, a hamlet of Hutton, Somerset, U.K.

== See also ==
- Canada (disambiguation)
