= Canadiana (disambiguation) =

Canadiana refers to things related to the country of Canada.

Canadiana may also refer to:

- Canadiana (comics), a webcomic created by Sandy Carruthers
- Canadiana (horse), a Canadian Thoroughbred racehorse
- Canadiana.org, a non-profit digital library dedicated to preserving Canadian culture
- Canadiana (web series), a documentary web series about Canadian history
- Aethes canadiana, a moth of family Tortricidae
- SS Canadiana, a passenger ferry that operated between Buffalo, New York, United States and Crystal Beach, Ontario, Canada
