= Canaday =

Canaday is a surname and phonetically equivalent to Kennedy. Notable people with the surname include:

- John Canaday (1907–1985), American art historian
- Kameron Canaday (born 1993), American football player
- Margot Canaday, American historian
- Sage Canaday (born 1985), American long-distance runner
- Molly Canaday (1903–1971), American painter

== See also ==
- Canada (surname)
