= René Lezama Aradillas =

Mexican politician

- Born: 22 September 1964 (age 61); Puebla, Mexico
- Education: Universidad Iberoamericana
- Occupation: Politician
- Political party: PAN

René Lezama Aradillas (born 22 September 1964) is a Mexican politician from the National Action Party (PAN).

Lezama Aradillas served as the municipal president of Tehuacán, Puebla, from 1996 to 1999. In the 2006 general election he was elected to the Chamber of Deputies to represent Puebla's 15th district during the 60th session of Congress.
