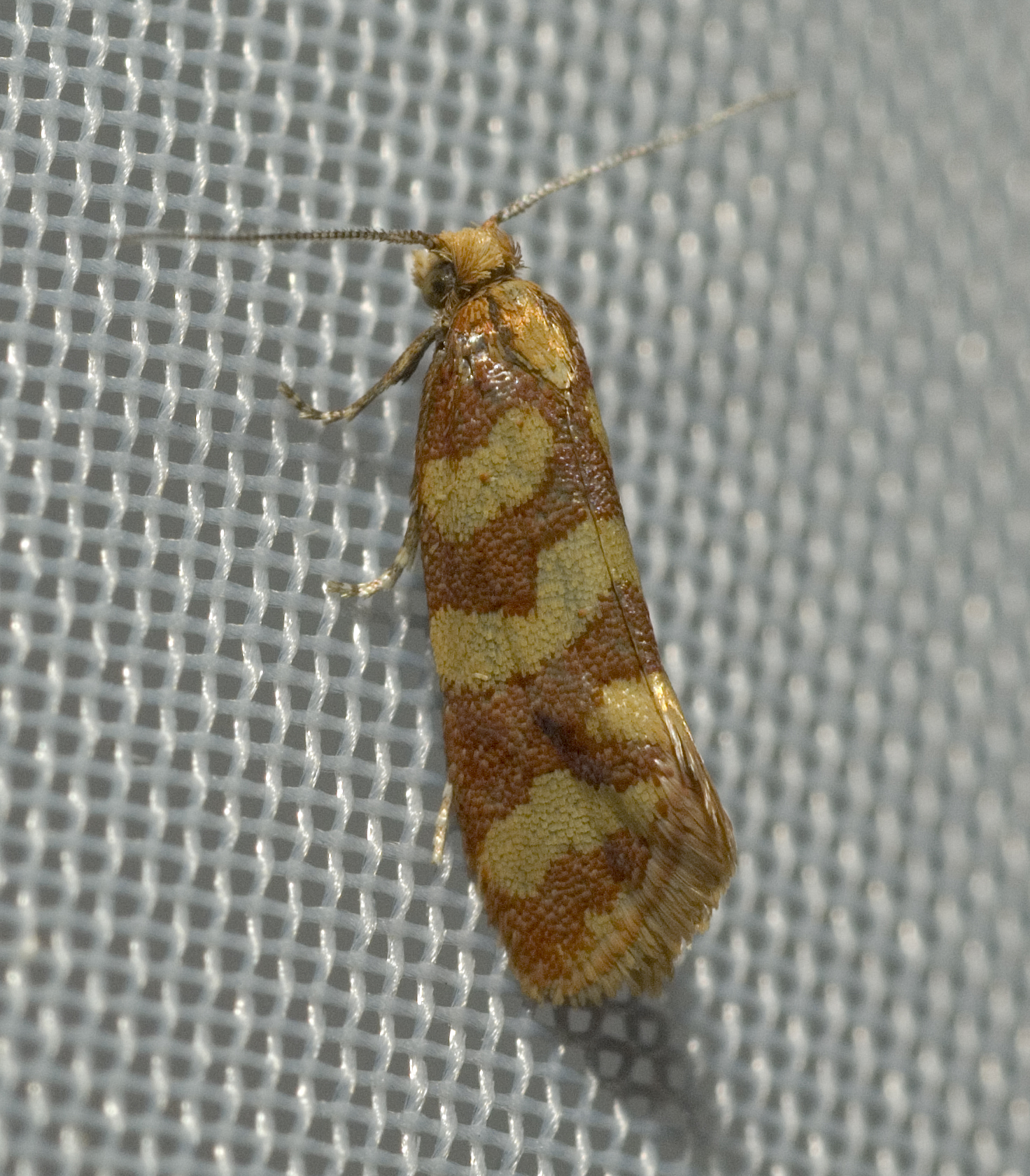

Scientific classification
- Kingdom: Animalia
- Phylum: Arthropoda
- Class: Insecta
- Order: Lepidoptera
- Family: Tortricidae
- Genus: Aethes
- Species: A. rutilana

Binomial name
- Aethes rutilana (Hübner, 1817)

Synonyms
- Tortrix rutilana Hübner, [1814-1817]; Conchylis rutilana f. interruptana Klemensiewicz, 1907; Tinea purpurella Coquebert de Montbret, 1801; Conchylis roridana Mann, 1867; Phalonia rutilana tatricana Adamczewski, 1936

= Aethes rutilana =

Pale juniper webworm

Species of moth

Aethes rutilana, the pale juniper webworm, is a species of moth in the family Tortricidae. It was first described by Jacob Hübner in 1817. It is found throughout Europe and North America.

The wingspan is 10–13 millimetres (0.39–0.51 in).

The larvae feed on Juniperus communis.

== Subspecies ==
- Aethes rutilana rutilana
- Aethes rutilana canadiana (Razowski, 1997)
- Aethes rutilana tatricana (Adamczewski, 1936)
