= Cañada del Hoyo =

Municipality in Cuenca Province, Castile-La Mancha, Spain

- Municipality
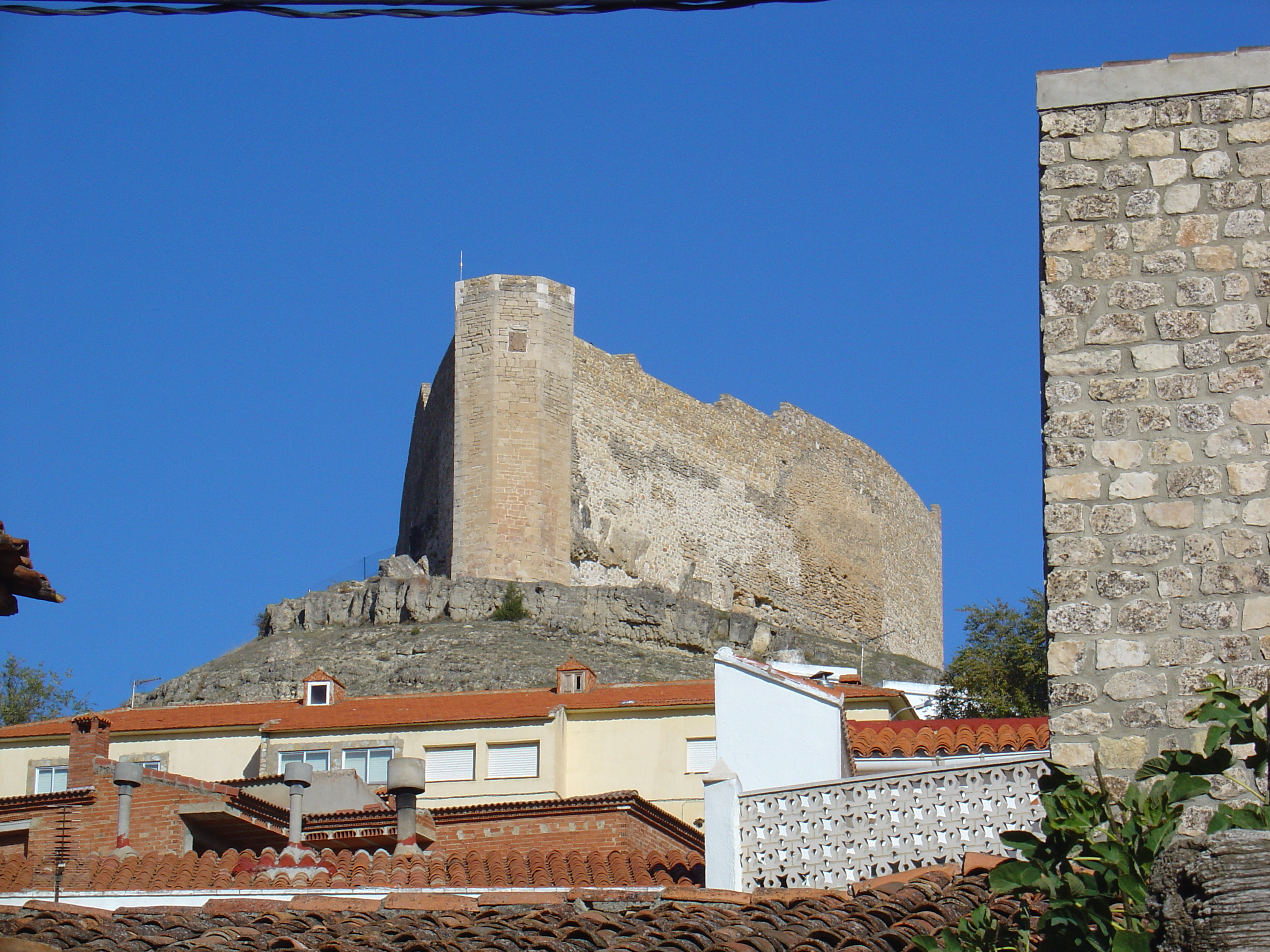

- Flag Coat of arms

- Location within Spain Location within Castilla-La Mancha
- Coordinates: 39°58′N 1°54′W
- Country: Spain
- Autonomous community: Castile-La Mancha
- Province: Cuenca

Population (2025-01-01)
  - Total: 221
- Time zone: UTC+1 (CET)
  - Summer (DST): UTC+2 (CEST)

Cañada del Hoyo is a municipality in Cuenca, Castile-La Mancha, Spain. It has a population of 333.
