= Kanata =

Kanata may refer to:

== People ==
- Kanata Aikawa (相川 奏多; born 2004), Japanese voice actress
- Amane Kanata (天音かなた), Japanese virtual Youtuber
- Kanata Hongō (本郷 奏多; born 1990), Japanese actor, voice actor and model
- Kanata Irei (伊礼 彼方; born 1982), Japanese actor, musician and fashion model
- Kanata Okajima (岡嶋 かな多; born 1984), a multi-platinum songwriter
- Konami Kanata (こなみ かなた; born 1958), Japanese manga artist

== Fictional characters ==
- Kanata Asumi, the main character of tokusatsu series Ultraman Decker
- Kanata Futaki, a character from visual novel series Little Busters!
- Kanata Higa, a character from anime manga series Harukana Receive
- Kanata Izumi, a character from the anime/manga series Lucky Star
- Kanata Konoe, a character from the media project Nijigasaki High School Idol Club
- Kanata Shinkai, a character from the idol rhythm game Ensemble Stars!
- Maz Kanata, a former space pirate in the sequel era of the Star Wars universe

== Other uses ==
- Kanata, Ontario, a suburban district of Ottawa, Canada
- Kanata (electoral district), a federal riding in Canada
- Kanata, an Iroquoian term meaning "village" or "settlement," considered to be the origin of the name of Canada
- 52500 Kanata, an asteroid

== See also ==
- Canada (disambiguation)
- Kannada (disambiguation)
