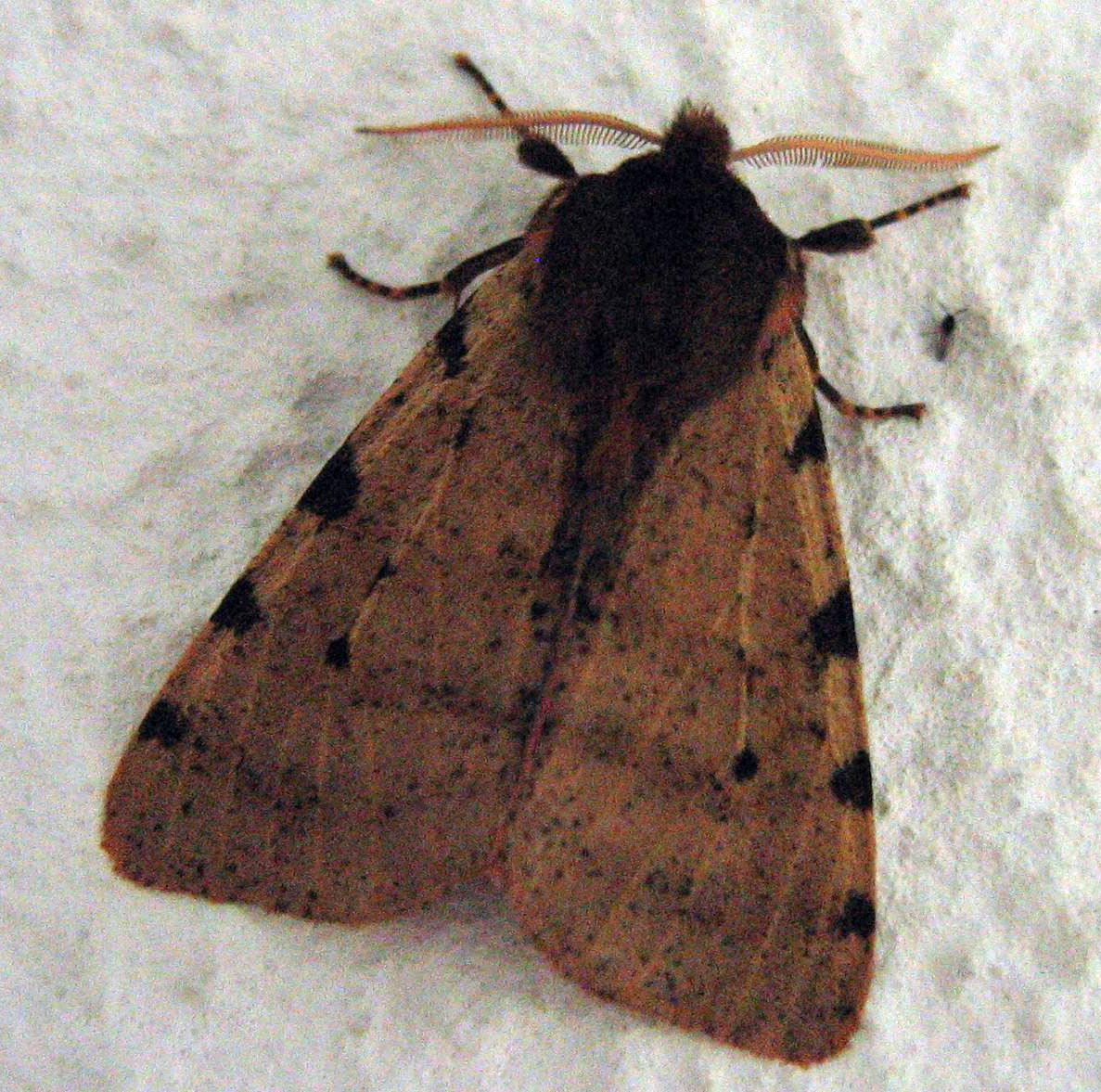

Scientific classification
- Kingdom: Animalia
- Phylum: Arthropoda
- Clade: Pancrustacea
- Class: Insecta
- Order: Lepidoptera
- Superfamily: Noctuoidea
- Family: Erebidae
- Subfamily: Arctiinae
- Genus: Canararctia; Dubatolov, 1990
- Species: C. rufescens

Binomial name
- Canararctia rufescens (Brullé, 1836)

Synonyms
- Liparis rufescens Brullé, 1836 (type species); Rhyparia rufescens (Brullé, 1836)

= Canararctia =

Genus and species of moth

Canararctia is a monotypic tiger moth genus in the family Erebidae erected by Vladimir Viktorovitch Dubatolov in 1990. Its only species, Canararctia rufescens, was first described by Gaspard Auguste Brullé in 1836. It is endemic to La Gomera and Tenerife in the Canary Islands.

The wingspan is 48–66 millimetres (1.9–2.6 in). The moth flies year round.

The larvae feed on various plants, including Myrica faya, Rumex lunaria, Kleinia neriifolia, Ricinus communis, Nicotiana glauca and Sonchus congestus.
