= Canada (band) =

American indie folk pop band

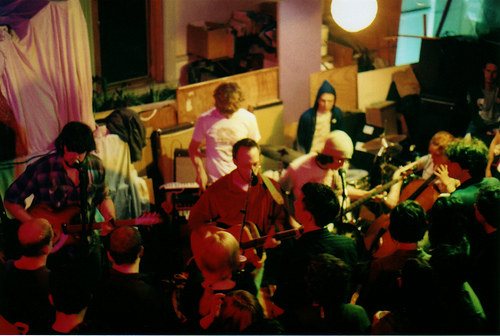
- Canada performing at Arborfest 2 in Ann Arbor, MI on May 13, 2006.

Background information
- Origin: Michigan, United States
- Genres: Folk music Pop music Indie (music)
- Label: Quite Scientific
- Members: Steven Rajewski; Joe Scott; Amy Sumerton; Aaron Saul; Aaron Shaul; Ryan Howard; Kaylan Mitchell
- Past members: Eileen Brownell

Canada is an American indie folk-pop music group from Ann Arbor, Michigan. Its songs are generally acoustic and feature guitars, drums, cellos, glockenspiels, melodicas, rhodes piano, organ and accordions. The group is known for its group vocals and harmonies and energetic live shows where members switch instruments between songs.

In a review for AllMusic, Rob Theakston wrote that "with a blend of pop, folk, and country, Canada keeps an even keel with amazing melodies and even more engaging instrumentation, never becoming tiresome or trite in its mission to craft the perfect pop song... They have made what could very well be the best pop album to come out of the ever-fruitful Detroit music scene in 2006, and considering the quality of the competition, that's no small praise."

The band, composed of long-time friends, formed in late 2004 and self-released the six song How Dare You EP in July 2005. Soon after, they were approached by indie Michigan label Quite Scientific and soon signed with them to record a full-length album. Recording took place during the fall and winter of 2005 in Lansing, Michigan on a soundboard originally used to mix portions of the second and third Star Wars films.

The band released its first album, This Cursed House, in June 2006. The album became the No. 1 most-added album in college radio for June 20, 2006, and later climbed to No. 13 on the CMJ Radio Top 200 (CMJ New Music Report, Issue 971).

Canada proceeded to embark on a series of tours with friends Page France (Suicide Squeeze), Saturday Looks Good To Me (Polyvinyl) Headlights (Polyvinyl), and Margot and the Nuclear So and So's (Artemis). Joe, Ryan, and Aaron (Shaul) became brief members of Saturday Looks Good To Me during this time, playing bass, drums, and glockenspiel respectively. Ryan later became a more permanent member with the group and toured with them as their drummer during their 2007 US and European tours. Canada also performed at the 2006 Pygmalion Music Festival in Champaign-Urbana, the 2006/7/8 CMJ Music Marathon in New York City and SXSW 2006/7 in Austin.

Canada embarked on its longest (8 week) nationwide tour in the summer of 2007. The band was prepping the release of their second full-length when creative, scheduling, and recording issues put a halt to production in late 2008.

On November 19, 2021, the band released their long-lost second album Put Singing Birds Into Your Messy Hair via Quite Scientific records.

== Discography ==
- The How Dare You EP (EP) (July, 2005)
- It Takes A Village To Make Records (Compilation) (March 25, 2006)
- This Cursed House (LP) (June 10, 2006)
- Canada Cassette EP (limited edition of 100) (EP) (June 7, 2007)
- Put Singing Birds Into Your Messy Hair (LP) (November 19, 2021)

== Sources ==
- https://web.archive.org/web/20071009205305/http://www.fanaticpromotion.com/cmj06/
- CMJ New Music Report, Issue 971
