= María Izaguirre Francos =

Mexican politician (1952–2025)

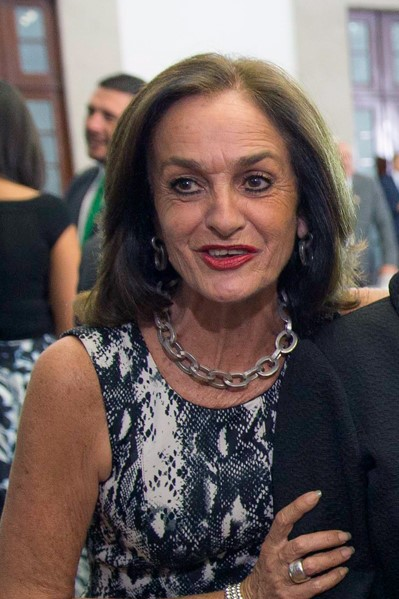
- Born: 8 June 1952; Tehuacán, Puebla, Mexico
- Died: 27 August 2025 (aged 73)
- Occupation: Politician
- Political party: PRI

María del Carmen Izaguirre Francos (8 June 1952 – 27 August 2025) was a Mexican politician affiliated with the Institutional Revolutionary Party (PRI).

== Life and career ==
Izaguirre Francos was born in Tehuacán, Puebla, in 1952. She has been elected to the Chamber of Deputies for Puebla's 15th district on two occasions: in the 2003 mid-terms, to serve during the 59th Congress, and in the 2009 mid-terms, to serve during the 61st Congress.

In the 2012 general election, she was elected to Senate for the state of Puebla.

Izaguirre Francos died on 27 August 2025, at the age of 73.
