= Cañada Morelos Municipality =

Coordinates: 18°44′N 97°25′W

Cañada Morelos
- Municipality
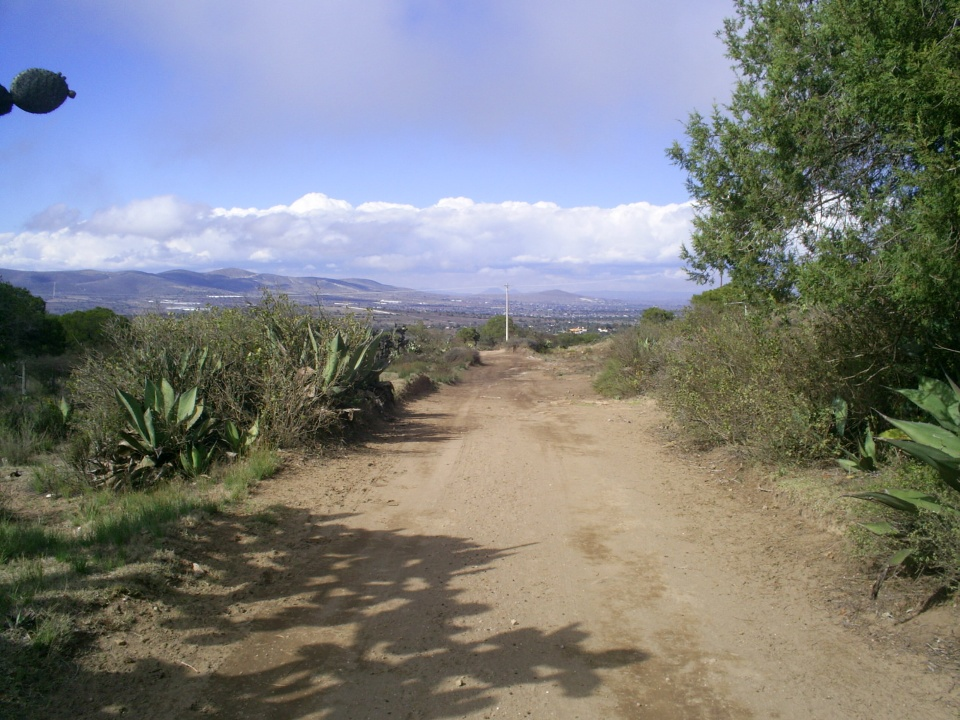

- Location of the municipality in Puebla
- Country: Mexico
- State: Puebla
- Time zone: UTC-6 (Zona Centro)

Cañada Morelos is a municipality in the Mexican state of Puebla.

Seat: Morelos Cañada
