= Kanada (surname) =

Kanada (written: 金田) is a Japanese surname. Notable people with the surname include:

- Craig Kanada (born 1968), American golfer
- Yasumasa Kanada (金田 康正, 1949–2020), Japanese mathematician
- Yasunobu Kanada (金田 裕伸, born 1963), Japanese sprint canoeist
- Yoshinori Kanada (金田 伊功, 1952–2009), Japanese animator
