= HMS Carnatic (1823) =

Ship of the line of the Royal Navy

History

United Kingdom
- Name: HMS Carnatic
- Ordered: 10 November 1817
- Builder: Portsmouth Dockyard
- Laid down: January 1818
- Launched: 21 October 1823
- Fate: Sold, 1914

General characteristics
- Class & type: 74-gun third rate ship of the line
- Tons burthen: 1790 bm
- Length: 177 ft (54 m) (gundeck)
- Beam: 48 ft 10 1/2 in (14.9 m)
- Depth of hold: 21 ft 2 in (6.45 m)
- Propulsion: Sails
- Sail plan: Full-rigged ship
- Armament: 74 guns: Gundeck: 28 × 32 pdrs; Upper gundeck: 28 × 18 pdrs; Quarterdeck: 4 × 12 pdrs, 10 × 32 pdr carronades; Forecastle: 2 × 12 pdrs, 2 × 32 pdr carronades

HMS Carnatic was a 74-gun third rate ship of the line of the Royal Navy, launched on 21 October 1823 at Portsmouth Dockyard. Her design was based on HMS Cornwallis, as completed.

Carnatic was used first as a store and then as a coal hulk in 1860, before becoming a powder store on loan to the War Department between 1886 and 1891, and then subsequently used by the Admiralty.

The ship was sold out of the navy in 1914 and broken up in Germany

== Figurehead ==
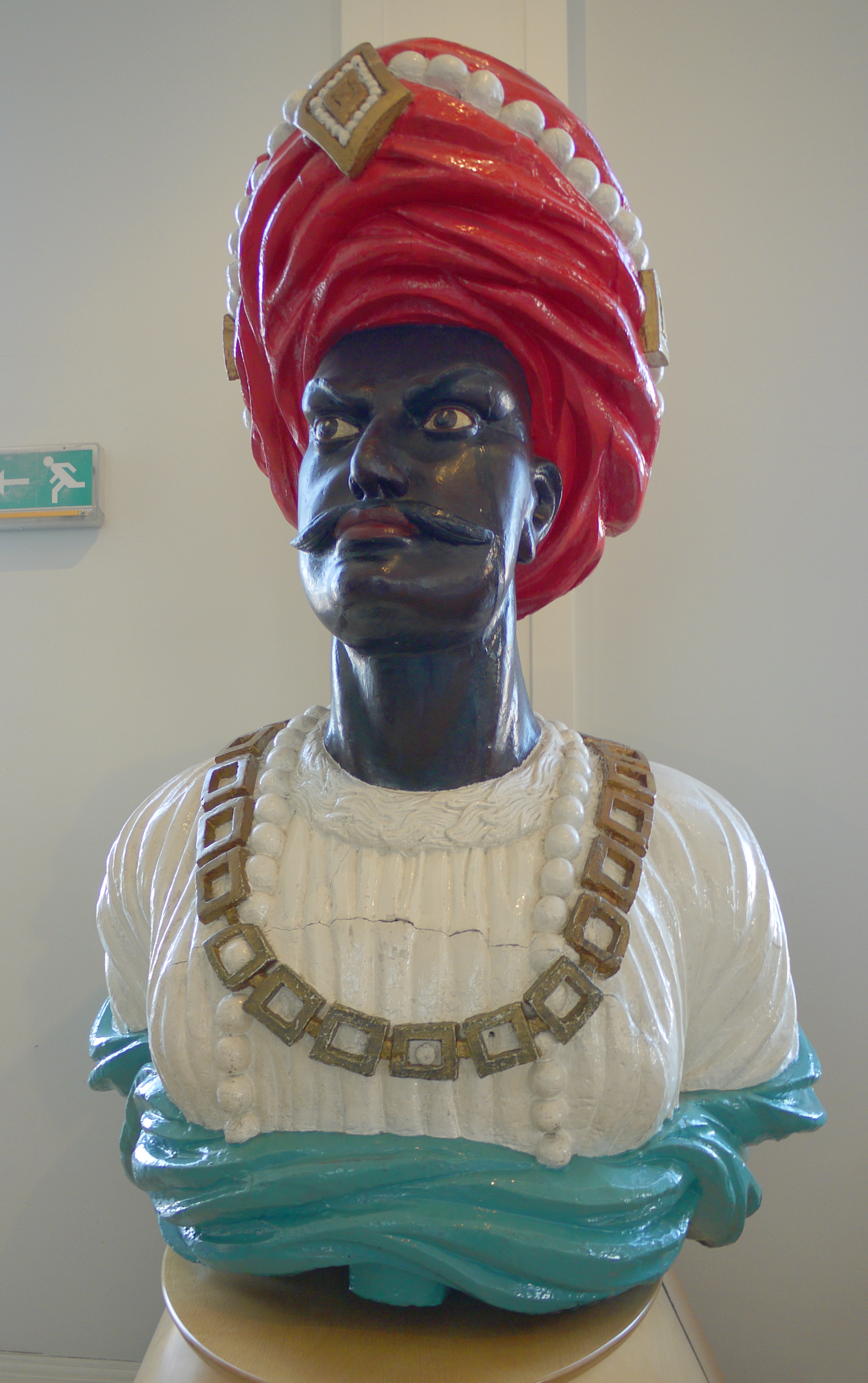
Figurehead of the HMS Carnatic

When the ship was sold for breaking up, the Admiralty instructed the figurehead be allocated to the Museum at Portsmouth, where it was eventually included in the 1919 edition of the Portsmouth Dockyard Museum's catalogue. The figurehead is part of the collection at the National Museum of the Royal Navy, Portsmouth.
