= La Cañada Observatory =

Observatorio J87 La Cañada
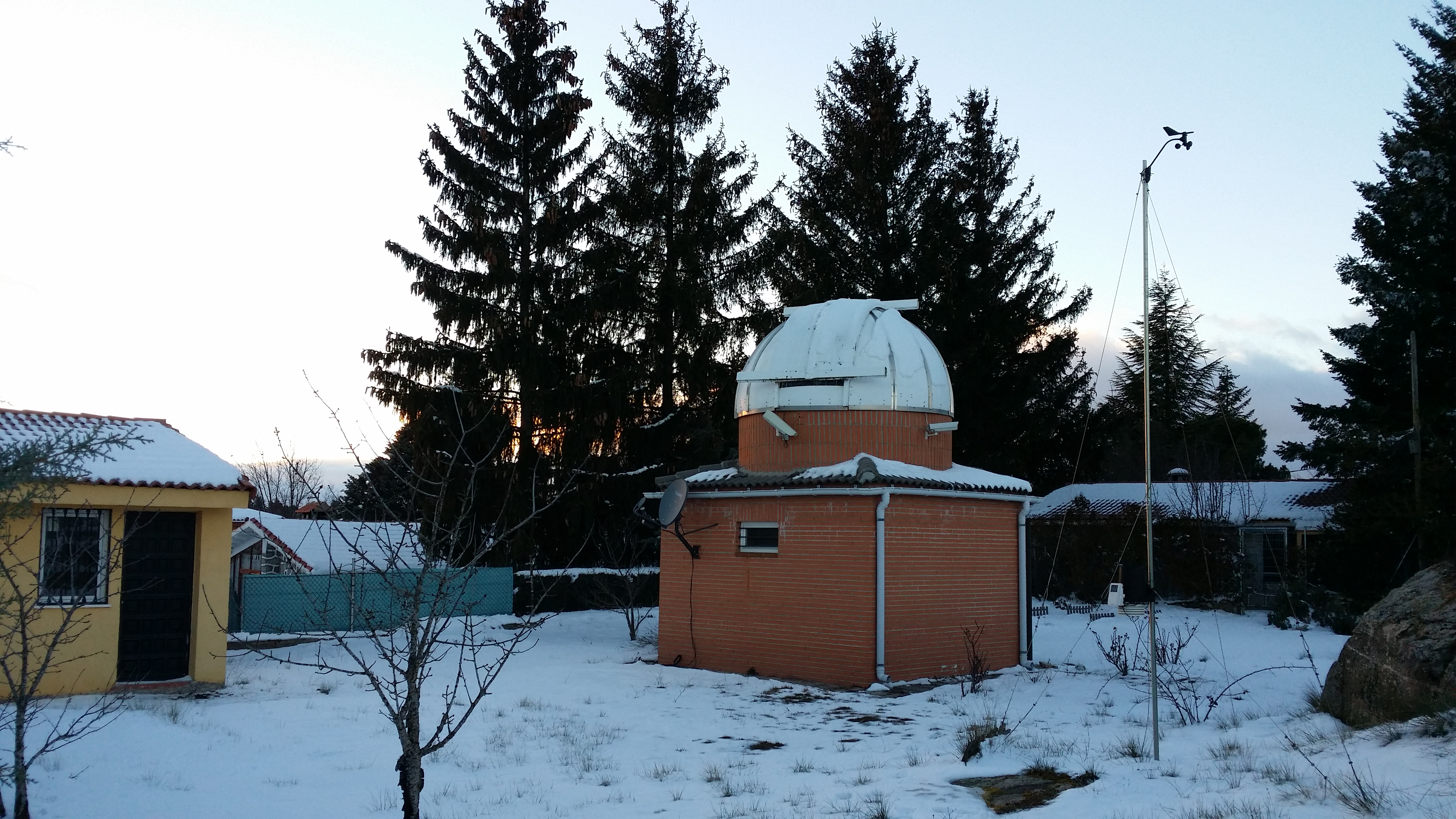
- Alternative names: La Cañada Observatory
- Organization: private
- Observatory code: J87
- Location: Ávila, Spain
- Coordinates: 40°36.235′N 4°29.589′W
- Altitude: 1,400 m (4,600 ft)
- Established: 2002
- Website: www.lacañada.es
- Related media on Commons

La Cañada Observatory (Spanish: Observatorio La Cañada), is an astronomical observatory in Ávila, Spain privately owned by Juan Lacruz, the main activity is to monitor near-Earth objects other asteroids and comets.

The observatory joined the International Astronomical Union sending the first astrometric observations in the summer of 2002. The Minor Planet Center assigned the observatory code J87: La Cañada.

Instrumental :

Telescope 0.41m F10 Ritchey-Chrétien + CCD

== Gallery ==
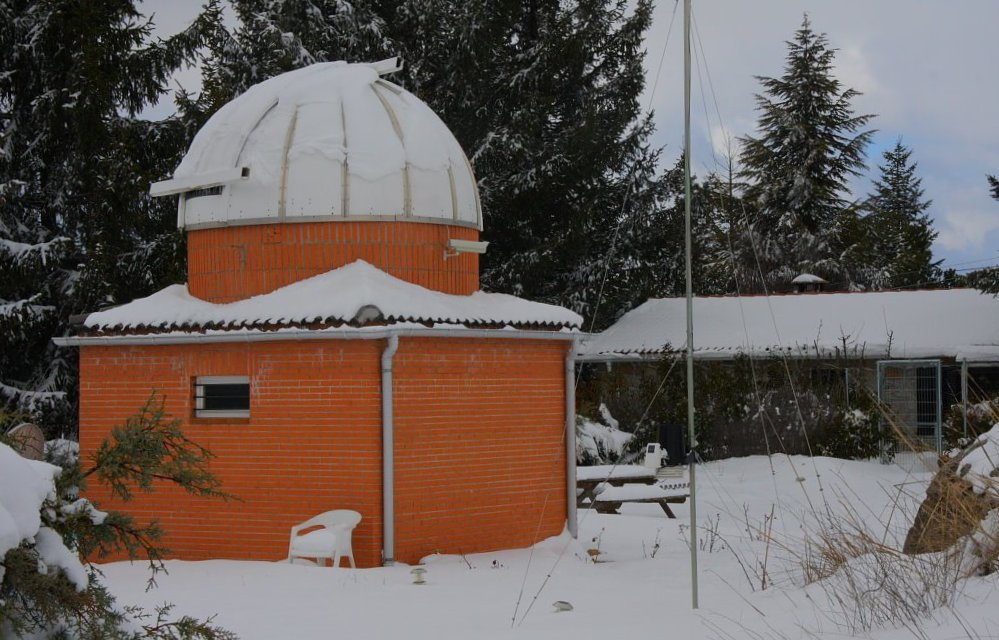
A winter view of the observatory

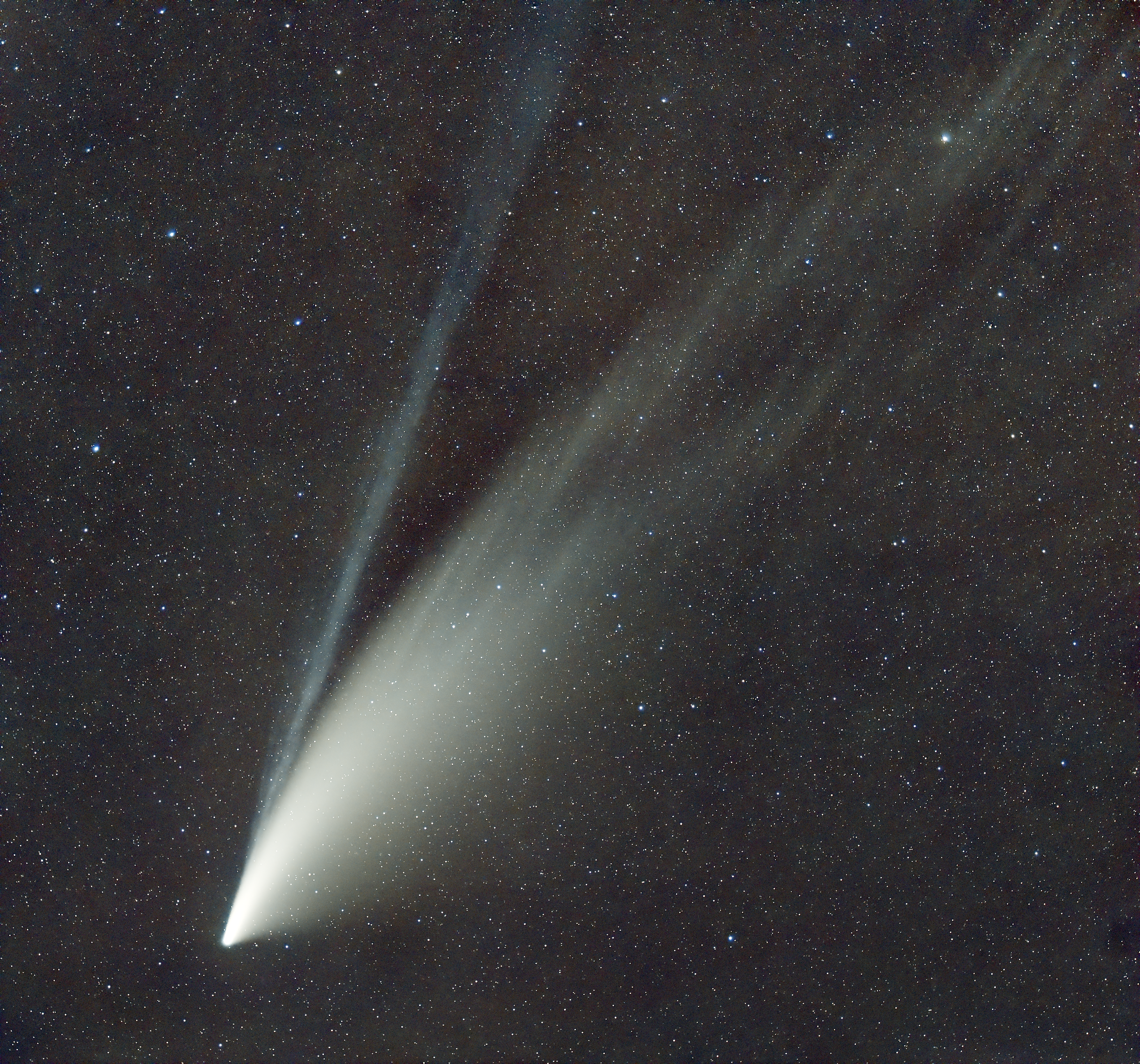
Comet C/2020 (NEOWISE) 17-07-2020 20:51:57 UTC

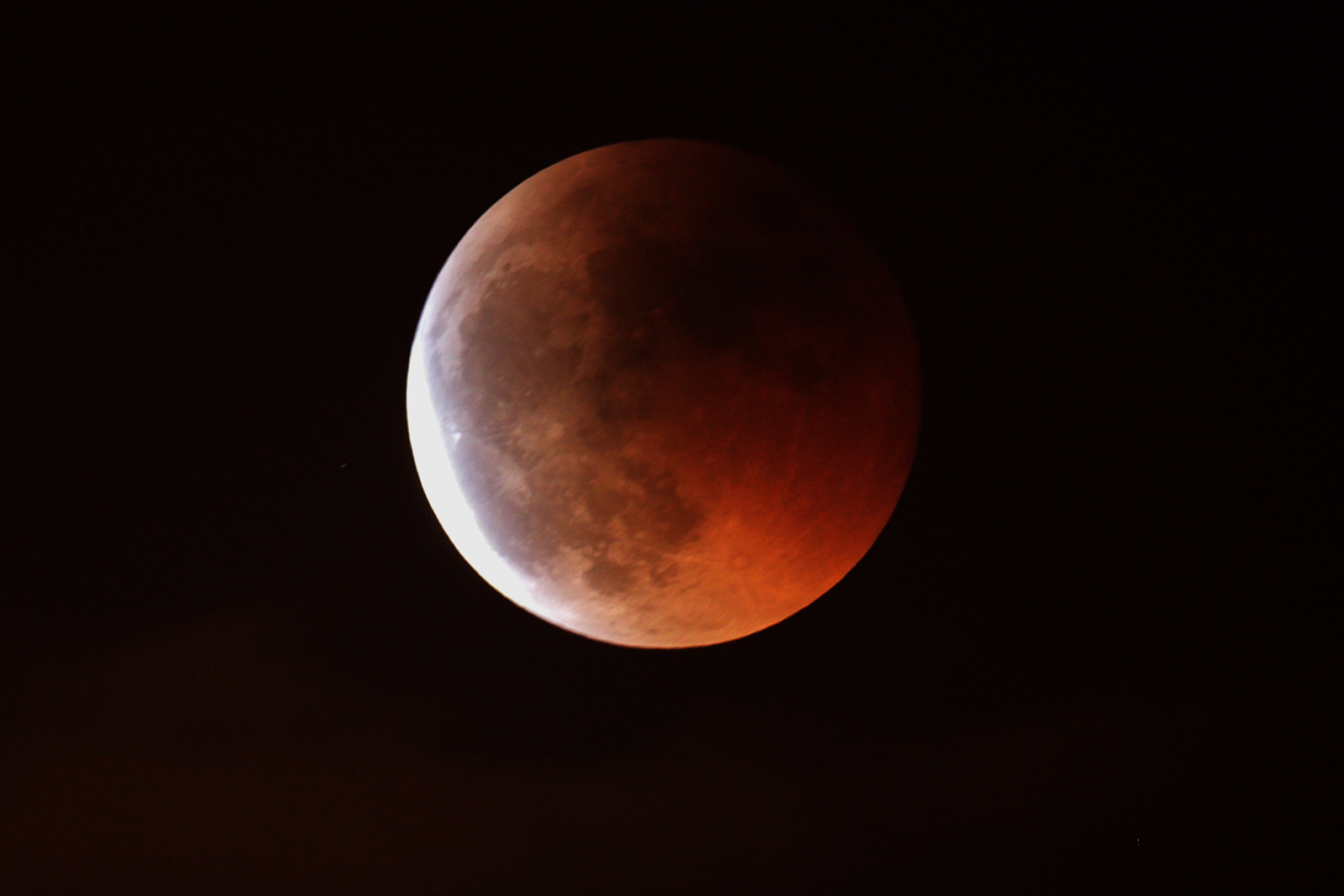
Lunar eclipse

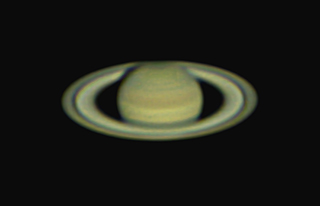
Saturn as seen at La Cañada on 1 August 2015

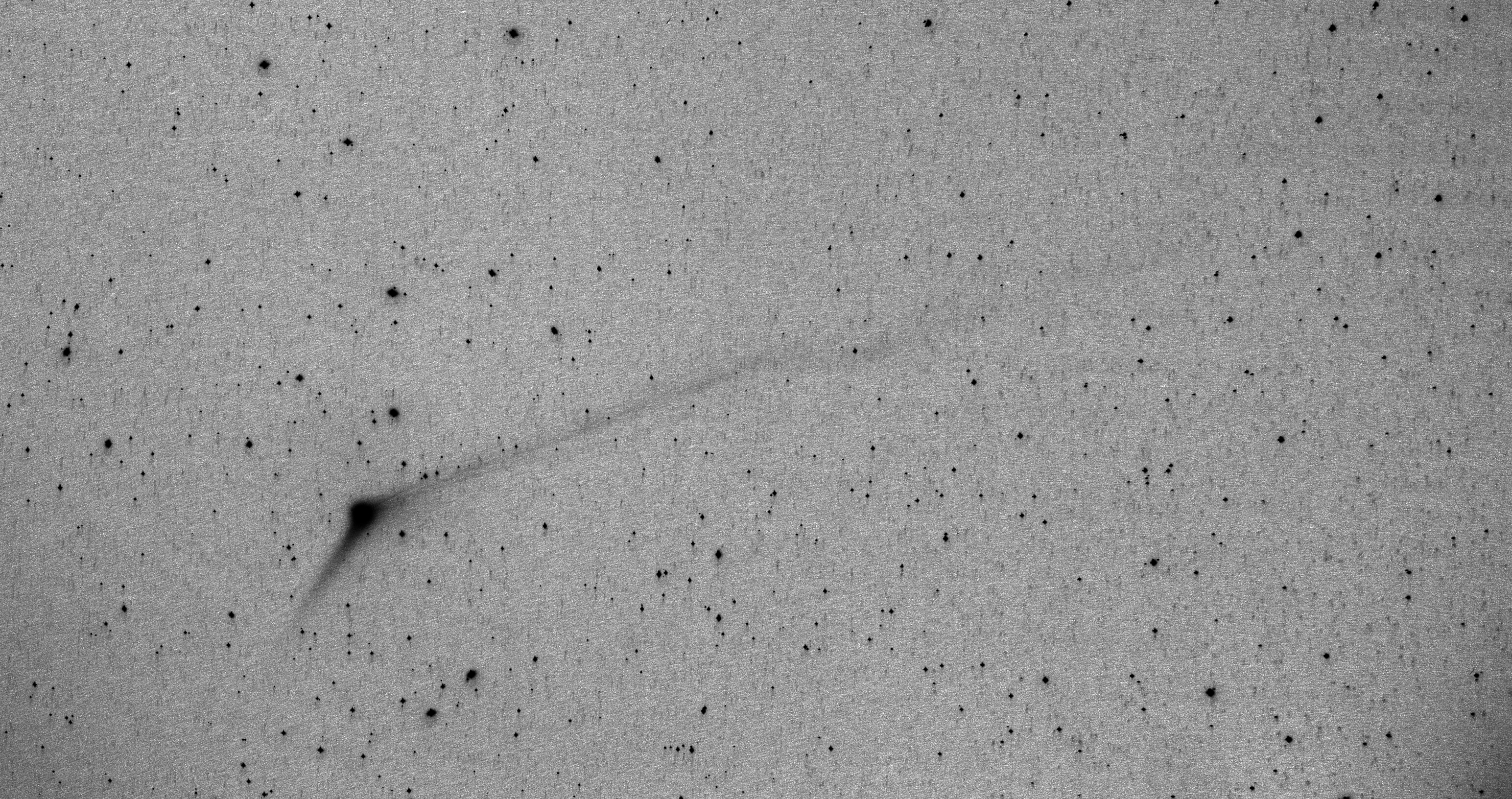
Comet C/2013 US10 Catalina as viewed from La Cañada on 6 December 2015; tail disconnection event

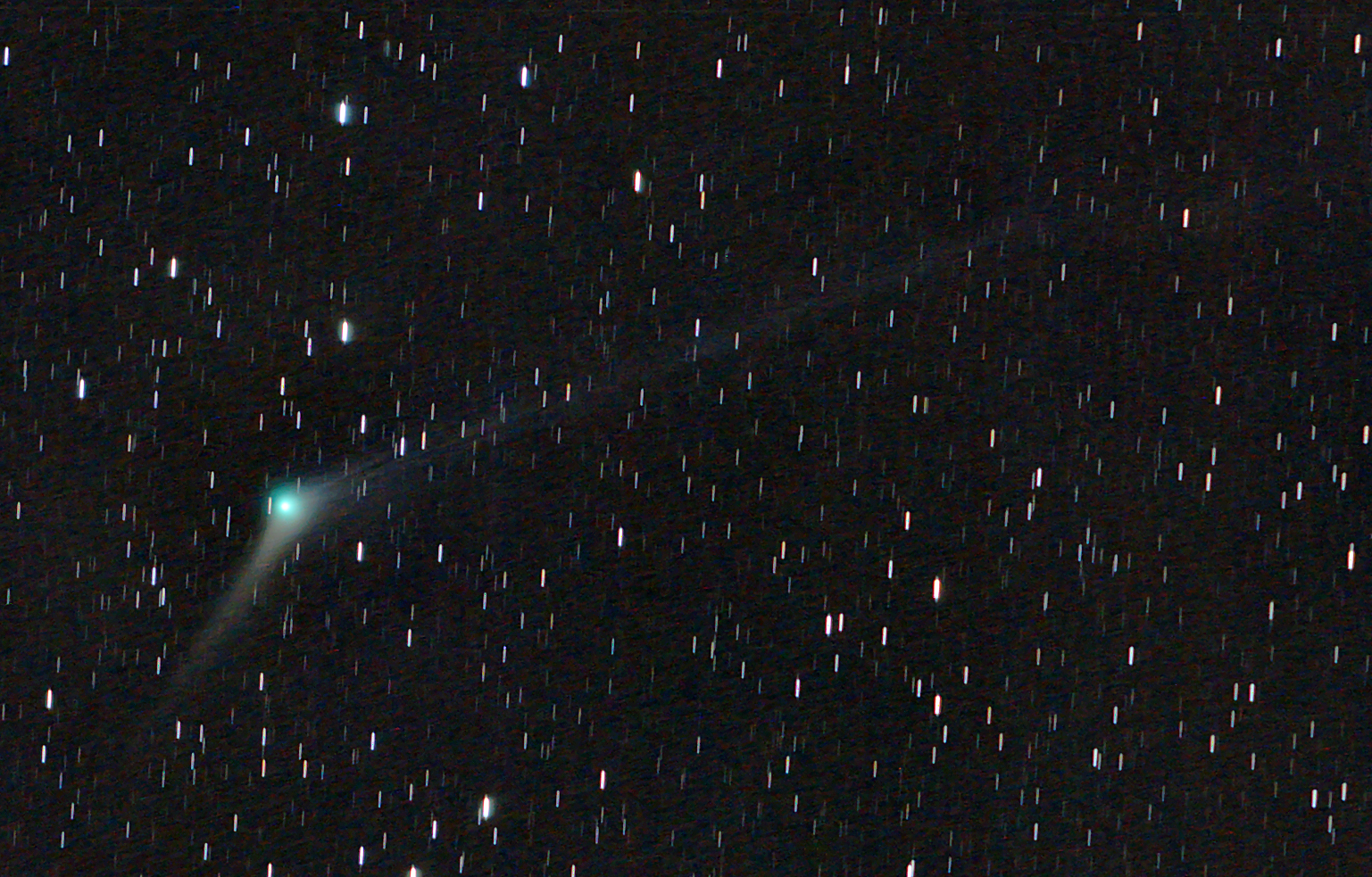
C/2013 US10 Catalina imaged on 6 December 2015

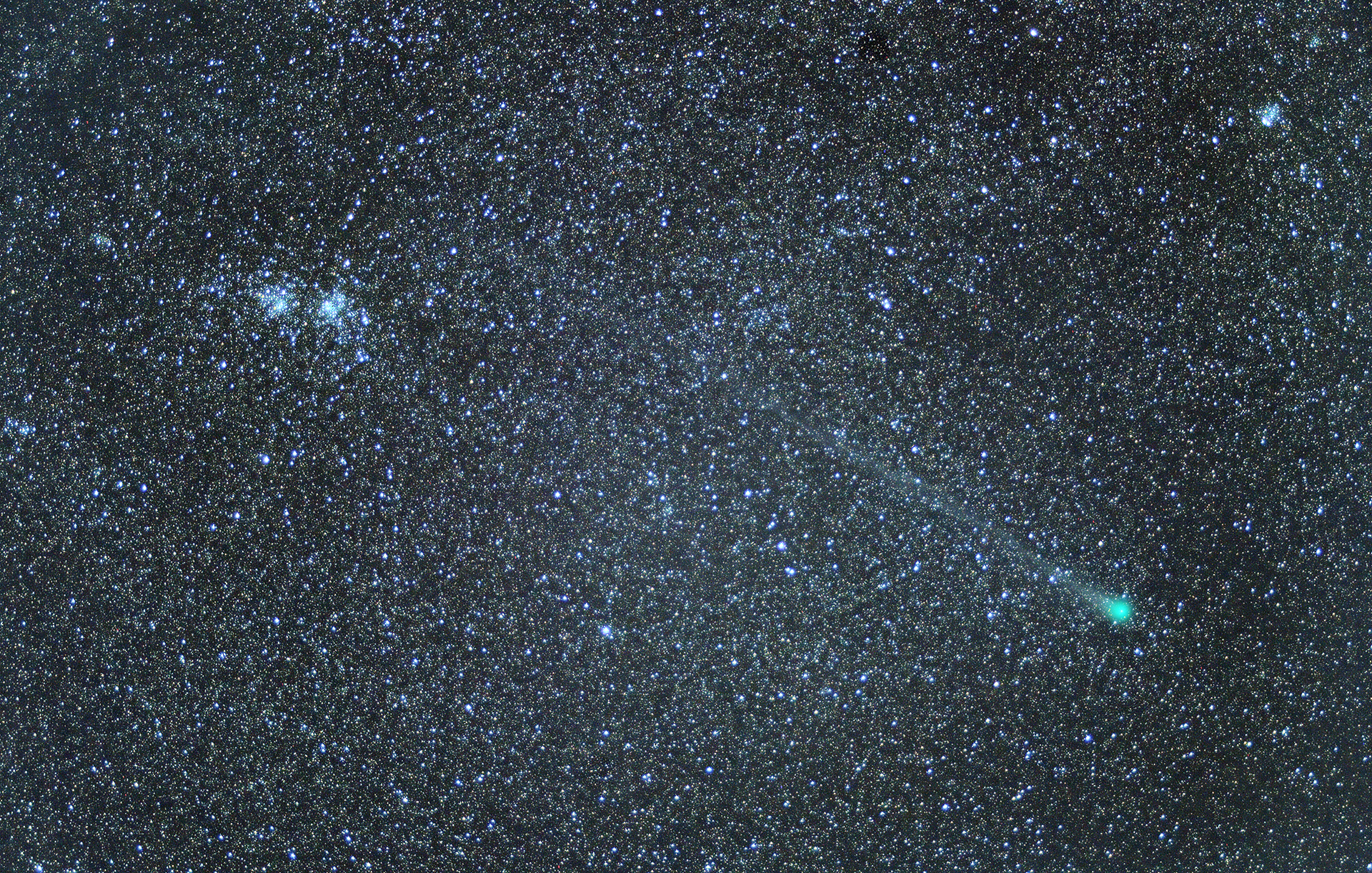
Comet C2014_Q2 Lovejoy and the Perseus double cluster imaged at La Cañada on 27 February 2015

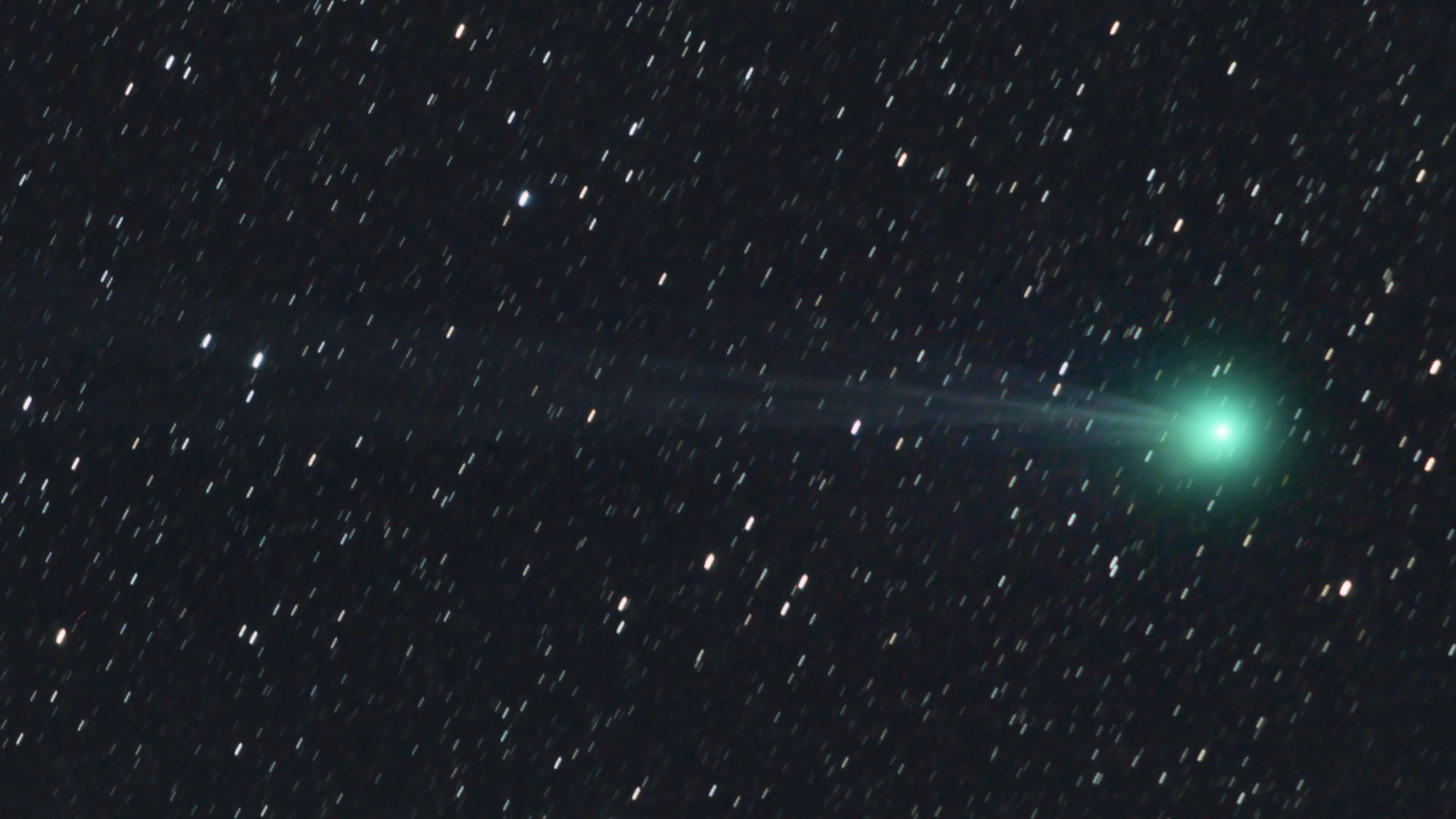
Comet C/2014 Q2 Lovejoy, 24 January 2015, La Cañada

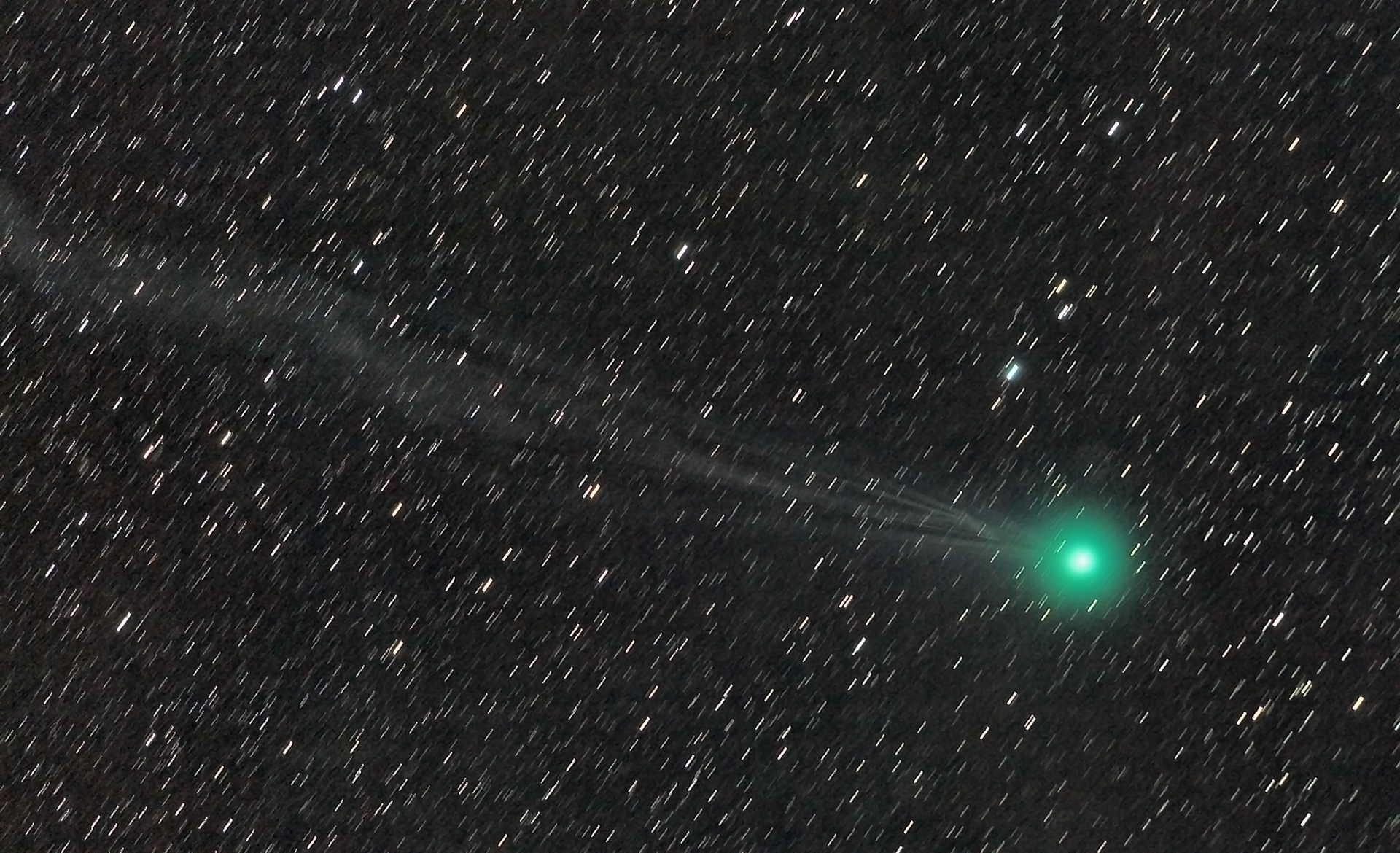
C2014 Q2 Lovejoy 9 January 2015, La Cañada

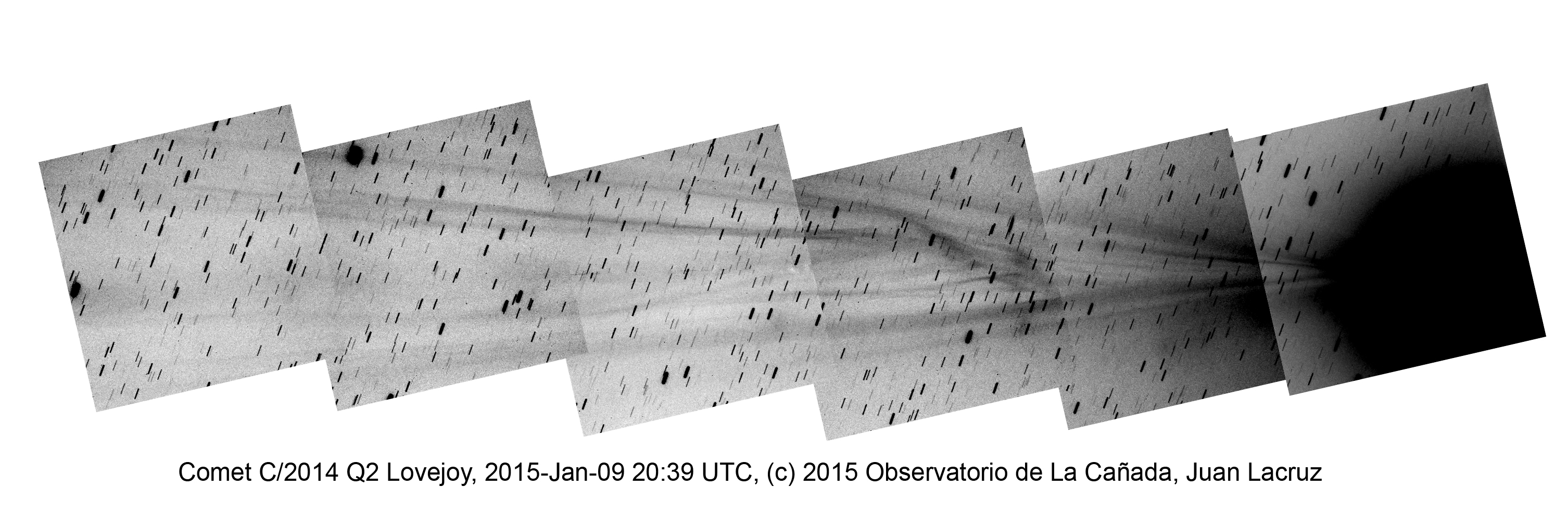
Comet C/2014 Q2 Lovejoy, a CCD mosaic composition taken on 9 January 2015, from La Cañada by Juan Lacruz.

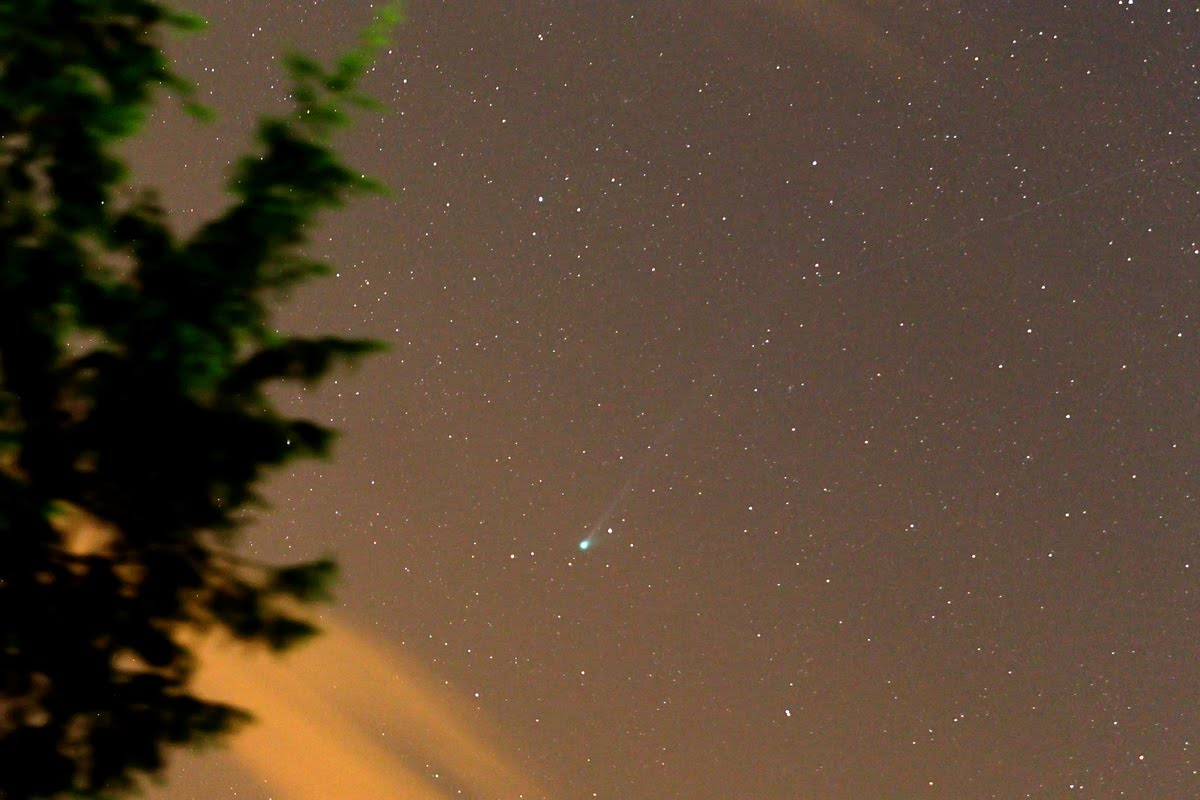
Comet C/2009 R1 Mc Naught as seen at La Cañada, Ávila, on 19 June 2010

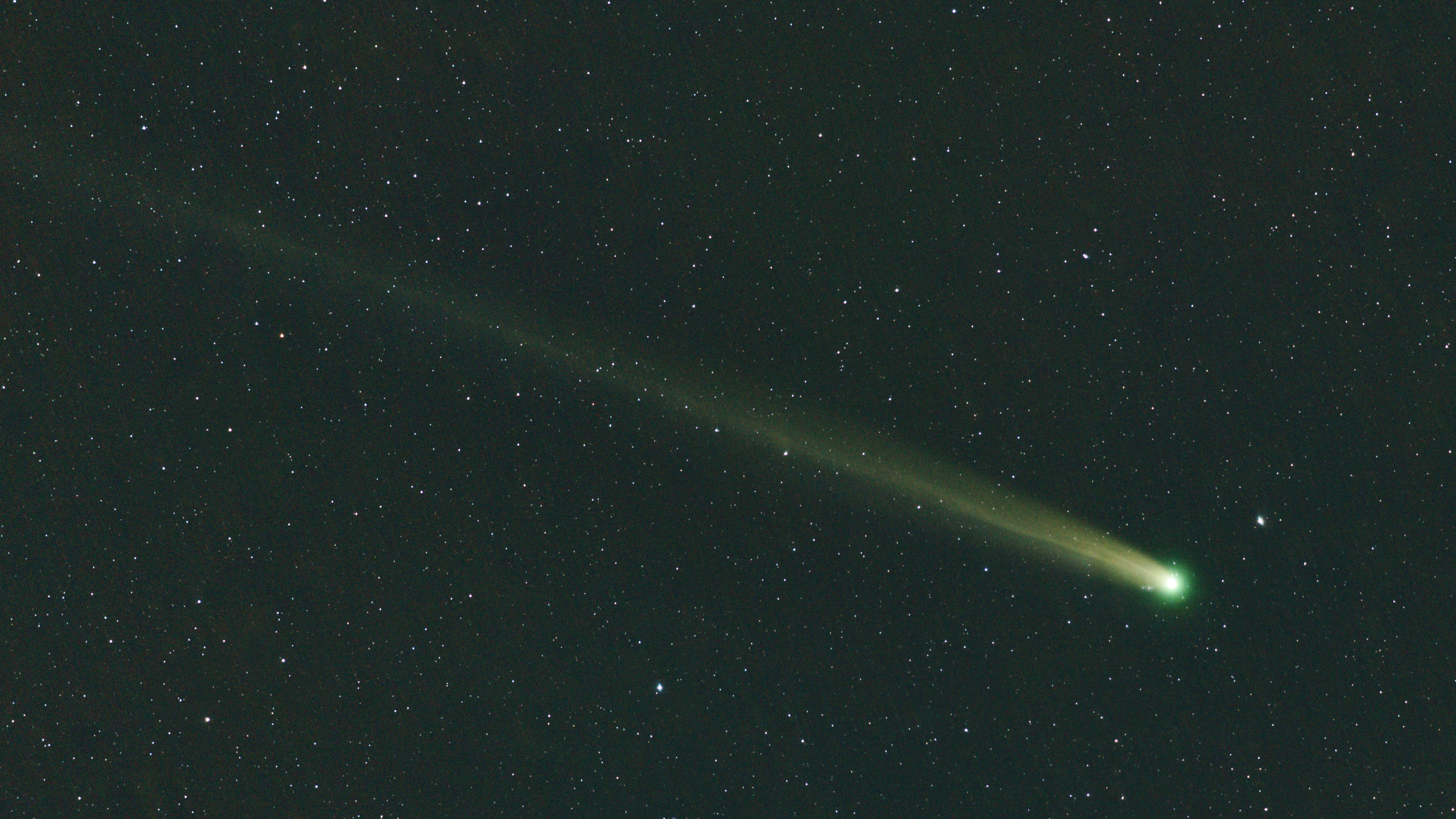
Comet C/2013 R1 Lovejoy, 6 December 2013, La Cañada

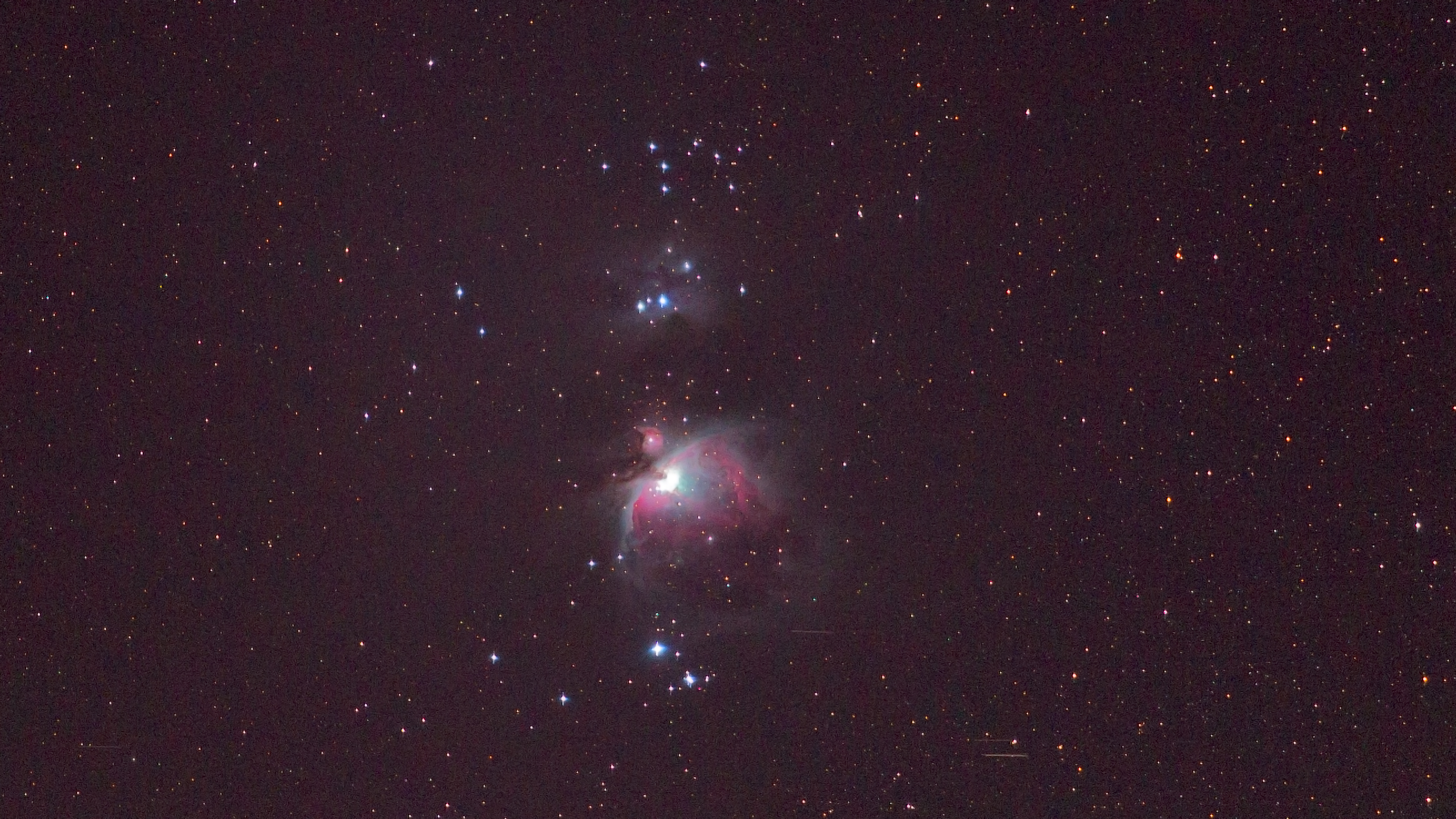
The Orion Nebula, La Cañada, 23 November 2013

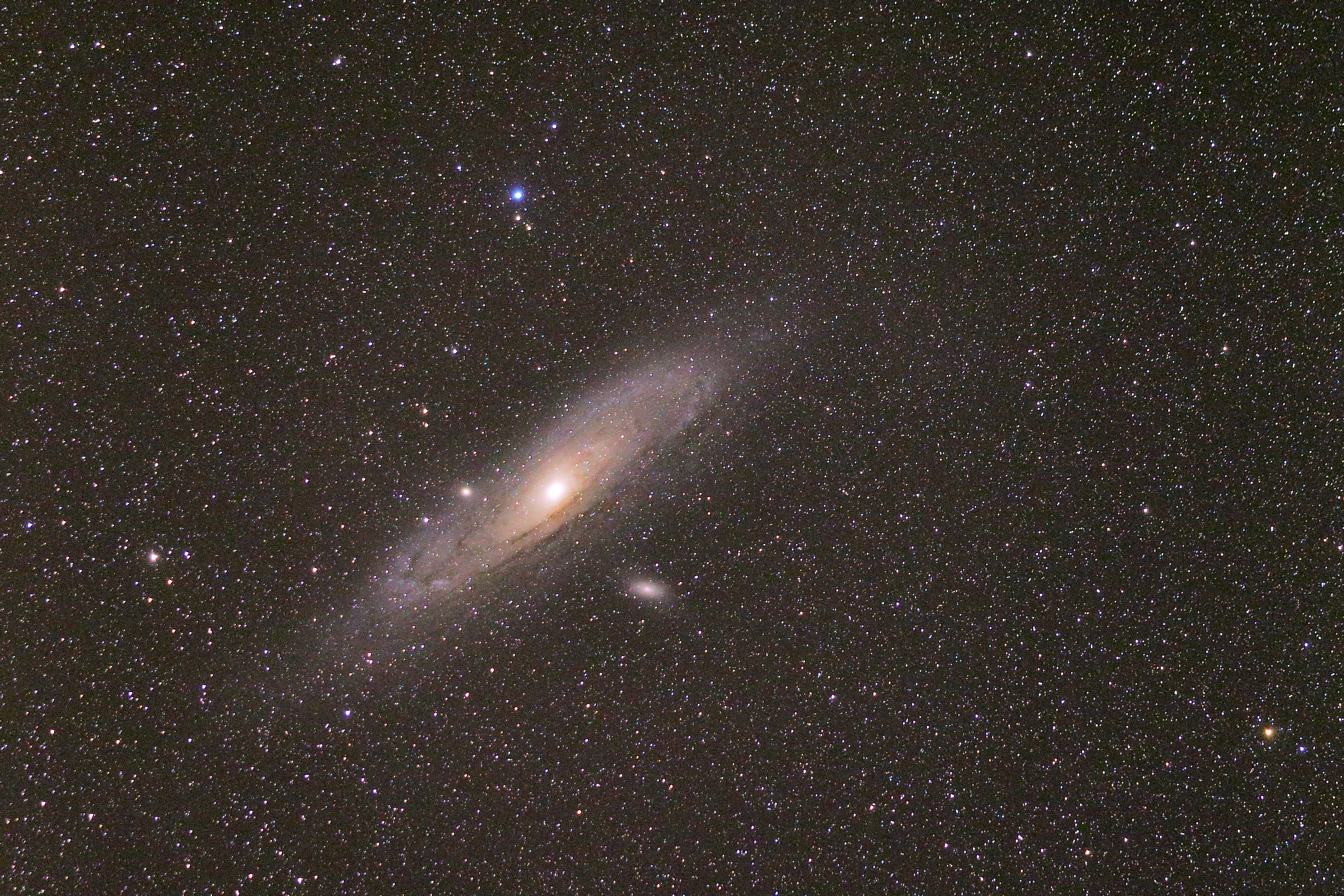
The Andromeda Galaxy, 6 December 2013

The Andromeda Galaxy, 14 November 2015

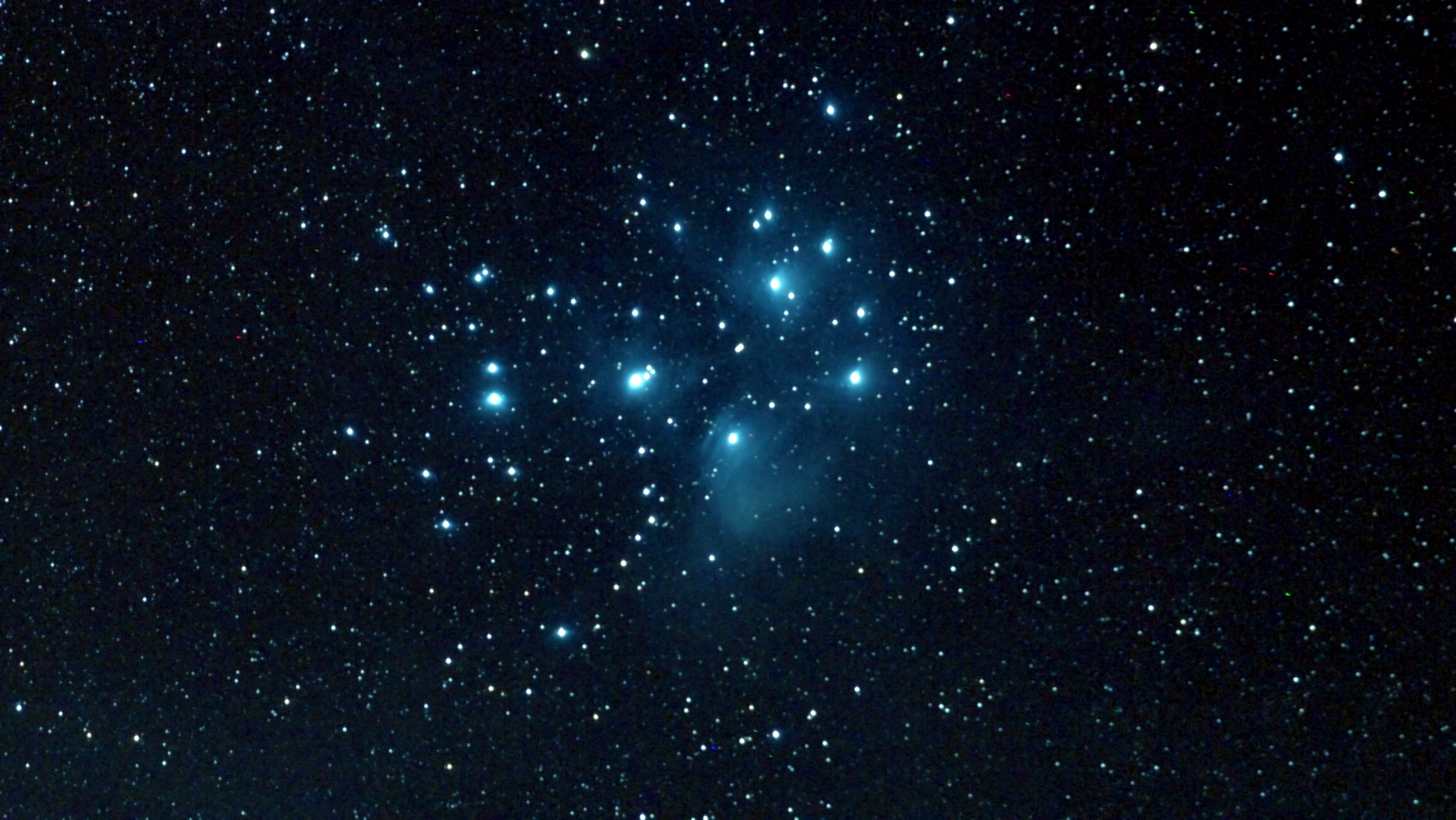
The Pleiades
