= HMS Carnatic =

Two vessels of the Royal Navy have been named HMS Carnatic after the Carnatic region:

- HMS Carnatic (1783) was a 74-gun Carnatic-class ship of the line launched in 1783. She was renamed Captain in 1815 and broken up in 1825.
- HMS Carnatic (1823) was a 72-gun Cornwallis-class ship of the line launched in 1823 but never commissioned. She was converted into a coal hulk in 1860 and a powder hulk in 1886 before being sold in 1914. She was broken up in Germany.

== See also ==
- HMIS Carnatic (J199), a Royal Indian Navy Bangor-class minesweeper
