= Canadiana (web series) =

Canadian history documentary YouTube channel

- Genre: Documentary
- Directed by: Ashley Brook; Kyle Cucco
- Country of origin: Canada
- Original languages: English (25 episodes); French (5 episodes)
- No. of seasons: 3
- No. of episodes: 25

Production
- Producer: Ashley Brook
- Production locations: Quebec; Ontario; British Columbia; Yukon; Vancouver Island; New Brunswick; Manitoba; Nova Scotia; Newfoundland and Labrador
- Production company: The Canadiana Project

Original release
- Release: August 15, 2017

Canadiana is a documentary web series about Canadian history, hosted by Canadian historian Adam Bunch. The first video in the series premiered on the Canadiana YouTube channel on August 14, 2017. Episodes are hosted and feature on-location footage, cut-out archival animations and visual effects.

In January 2018 the Bell Fund announced it would fund Canadiana's second season. Following the success of season 2, which included a Canadian Screen Award nomination, a third season received a green light for production in late 2020. Season 3, episode 1 premiered on June 28, 2022 on the Canadiana YouTube channel.

== Reception ==
In 2019, the series won a Golden Sheaf Award for Best Research from Yorkton Film Festival and a Canadian Cinema Editors Award for Best Editing in a Web Based Series.

Canadiana was nominated for a Canadian Screen Award for Best Web Program or Series, Non-Fiction, by the Academy of Canadian Cinema and Television in 2020. In 2023, the series was nominated for a Rockie Award from Banff World Media Festival in the Short Form Non-Fiction category.

Of its third season, POV Magazine called Canadiana an "exploration of the oft-overlooked history of Canada [that] gives the nation's past the colour it deserves." As of March 2023, season 3 has received media attention from CBC's Metro Morning, CBC Radio One, CTV News Channel, CFRB, Global News Morning, and more.

Canadiana was previously featured on Breakfast Television, Global News, Newstalk 1010 and Elmnt FM, and has received praise by blogs and podcasts for its approach to Canadian history. Canadiana has been selected to screen at T.O. Webfest, NYC Web Fest, Miami Web Fest, Hollyweb Festival, Stareable Fest L.A., Sicily Web Fest, The National Screen Institute's NSI Online Short Film Festival, and Yorkton Film Festival. The series also took home the IWCC Canadian Story Spotlight Award at T.O. WebFest in 2019.

== Episodes ==
=== Season 1 ===
- 101 – The Bizarre History of O Canada: The story of Canada's national anthem, from the 1600s to the 1980s. Composed by Calixa Lavallee and Sir Adolphe-Basile-Routhier, the song was originally linked to Saint-Jean-Baptiste Day and, as a result, it became deeply embedded in the turbulent history of Quebec before it was ever considered to represent the rest of the country. The documentary focuses attention on a riot that took place on Saint-Jean-Baptiste Day in 1968, where a crowd of protestors pelted Pierre Elliot Trudeau with rocks and bottles, to find out what the event has to do with O Canada.
- 102 – The Mystery of Meech Lake: The story of Thomas ‘Carbide’ Willson, a secretive scientist who changed the world with his inventions. The episode focuses on the ruins of Willson's laboratory, tucked away on the shore of famed Meech Lake, and gives a brief biography of the man.
- 103 – The Battle of Nepean Point: The story behind a suspiciously empty plinth at the base of Ottawa’s most prominent statue. The episode covers the relocation of the Indigenous ‘Scout’ that used to sit below Samuel de Champlain on Nepean Point, highlighting the controversy behind the decision and the history of the monument.
- 104 – The Exiled Princess of Ottawa: The story behind Ottawa's annual tulip festival. The episode covers the tale of Princess Juliana's escape from Nazi-occupied Netherlands during the Second World War, her stay in Ottawa, and the birth of her daughter, Princess Margriet, in a Canadian hospital.
- 105 – A Canadian Slavery Story: The story of Marie-Josèphe-Angélique, an enslaved woman in 1700s Montreal, and the history of slavery in Canada. The episode covers Angélique's daring escape attempts, as well as the famous fire of 1734 for which she was blamed and put on trial.
- 106 – The Love Triangle That Brought Down Québec: The story of an infamous trio of New France aristocrats whose underhanded dealings and corruption undermined an already weakened colony at the time of the Seven Years' War. The episode springs from a remnant of the fall of Québec, a disarmed bomb that sits along the famous Rue St. Louis in Quebec City.
- 107 – The "Midgets Palace" of Montreal: The story of Phillipe and Rose Nicol, which follows their journey from victims of exploitation to champions of the marginalized. The episode focuses on Phillipe, a man with dwarfism, and his transformation from ‘sideshow freak’ at Barnum and Bailey Circus to purveyor of the ‘Midgets Palace,’ a part-exhibit, part-hotel for little people in Montreal.

=== Season 2 ===
- 201 – The King of Queen's Park: The story behind one of the most prominent statues in Toronto’s Queen's Park, that of King Edward VII riding a horse. The episode unearths the strange and circuitous route the statue took to get from post-colonial India all the way to hippy-era Toronto in the 1960s.
- 202 – Camp 30: A Prisoner's Paradise: The story of a prisoner of war camp nestled in rural Bowmanville, Ontario. The episode describes the luxuries afforded to German soldiers who were shipped to Camp 30 from Europe, and an eventual rebellion within the camp's mess hall.
- 203 – Sudbury and the Mysteries of the Universe: The story of Sudbury’s rise to nickel capital of the world, and the cosmic origins that afforded it. The episode begins over 1.8 billion years ago when a comet struck the area, and ends in the modern day, two kilometres beneath the Earth's surface, in a mine where cutting-edge scientific experiments are at the forefront of the search for dark matter.
- 204 – The Forbidden City: The story of Canada's first Chinatown and what it has to do with the country's first ‘war on drugs,’ focused on the infamous Fan Tan Alley. The episode delves into the origins of the Chinese Canadian experience, discussing the hardships Chinese immigrants faced as well as their perseverance, represented by a series of ornate arches built in Victoria’s Chinatown.
- 205 – The Invincible Martha Black: The story of Martha Black, a trailblazer who climbed the world renown Chilkoot Pass to reach the Yukon during the Klondike Gold Rush. The episode follows Martha Black's voyage to Dawson City, highlighting moments from her life and scenes from the chaotic world of the gold rush.
- 206 – The Hidden Story Behind Vancouver's Twin Peaks: The story of the Lions mountains in North Vancouver and how colonizers changed their name from The Sisters in the late 1800s. The episode follows Chief Joe Capilano, his wife Mary, and the famed poet Pauline Johnson as they tried to keep the Indigenous legends of Vancouver alive in the face of erasure and adversity.
- 207 – The Assassination of D’Arcy McGee: The story of Canada's greatest murder mystery; the assassination of D’Arcy McGee, a Father of Confederation, on his way home from parliament in Ottawa. The episode depicts the night of the crime, the manhunt that took place afterward, and the infamous trial of Patrick James Whelan.
- 208 – Winnipeg's Secret Code: The story of the history of Winnipeg, capital of the Canadian province of Manitoba, told through an exploration of the Manitoba Legislative Building and trials of its construction in the early 1900s.

=== Season 3 ===
- 301 – The Pirate Legends of Canada (Part 1): The story of the pirates that plagued the colonies along what is now Canada's Atlantic Coast – including Peter Easton and Black Bart Roberts (Bartholomew Roberts). The episode covers the conditions that set the stage for pirates to run rampant in the Gulf of St. Lawrence and North Atlantic, namely, the cod fishing industry which boomed in the 1600s. Figures like John Guy, the governor of the first English colony in Newfoundland (Cupids), and Queen Elizabeth I figure prominently in a tale that starts with buried treasure on Île Haute, and ends at the height of the Golden Age of Piracy.
- 302 – The Pirate Legends of Canada (Part 2): Picking up where episode one left off, the second episode chronicles the decline of piracy in Canada, the rise of the privateer, and features notorious pirate Edward Low.
- 303 – The Toronto Forest that Brought Down Napoleon / La forêt qui a vaincu Napoléon: Released in both English and French, this minisode tells the history behind Rouge National Urban Park in Ontario, Canada. The story covers the history of the lumberjack and the role of Canadian lumber in naval warfare against Napoleon.
- 304 – How the Cold War Started...in Ottawa: The story of Russian cipher clerk Igor Gouzenko, who defected in Ottawa in 1945, exposing soviet intelligence's efforts to steal nuclear secrets. The act was credited as a triggering event of the Cold War.
- 305 – The Werewolf of Quebec / Le loup-garou de Québec: Released in both English and French, this minisode features the Fortifications of Quebec National Historic Site in Quebec City, Canada, and tells of a time in 1766 when a werewolf siting was reported on several occasions in the Gazette de Quebec. The video also covers French Canadian folklore and similar published accounts of the Beast of Gévaudan in France.
- 306 – When Americans Built a Road Across Canada: The episode chronicles the construction of the Alaska Highway — a massive road built through challenging Canadian terrain over a relatively short period of time during World War II.
- 307 – The Extraordinary Adventures of the Newfoundland Dog: The story of the Newfoundland dogs that helped shape Canada, including hero dogs that traveled with John Graves Simcoe, Alexander Mackenzie, and David Thompson, the legend of the dog that saved the passengers on board the shipwreck of the SS Ethie, and Gander (dog), who was posthumously awarded a medal for bravery after World War II.
- 308 – How the American Civil War Made Canada: A Canadian perspective on the American Civil War that highlights some of the Canadians who played a role in the Underground Railroad and Union Army. The episode examines historical tension between Canada and the United States prior to Canadian Confederation, including the War of 1812 and American Revolution, and looks at some Canadian defence strategies including the use of Martello towers and the SS Great Eastern.
- 309 – The Great Whale Robbery of Labrador: The history of Red Bay, Newfoundland and Labrador as a centre of commercial whaling in the 16th Century. The episode chronicles the arrival of Basque whalers in Labrador to hunt for bowhead whales in the Strait of Belle Isle during the 1500s. It also tells the story of a Spanish Supreme Court case that resulted from an alleged whale theft.
- 310 – The Engineering Marvel Built to Defend Against Americans – The Grisly History of the Rideau Canal: The history of the Rideau Canal, a popular tourist attraction in Ottawa and marvel of human engineering from the early 1800s. The episode tells the story of how the canal was originally built as a national defence strategy for Canada (pre-Confederation).
