= Canada Bay (disambiguation) =

Canada Bay is an estuarine bay on the Parramatta River in Sydney, Australia.

Canada Bay may also refer to:

- Canada Bay, New South Wales, a suburb of Sydney
  - City of Canada Bay, a local government area in Sydney, Australia
- Canada Bay, Newfoundland and Labrador, Canada
