= Canada House (disambiguation) =

Canada House is the Canadian High Commission in London, England.

Canada House may also refer to:

- Canada House, Berlin, the Embassy of Canada to Germany
- Canada House, Manchester, England, an office building
- Canada House, Sheffield, England, an office building
- Canada House, Tel Aviv, Israel, home of the Embassy of Canada to Israel
