= South Kanara District Chess Association =

- Abbreviation: SKDCA
- Type: Sports organisation
- Legal status: Association
- Purpose: Chess
- Headquarters: Mangalore
- Location: Around Coastal Karnataka
- Region served: Coastal Karnataka
- Members: Affiliated Clubs and Academies
- Affiliations: All India Chess Federation

South Kanara District Chess Association, also known as SKDCA, is an association for the game of chess, headquartered in Mangalore city of Karnataka in India. SKDCA has organized national level and FIDE rated chess tournaments, and international masters and grand masters have participated in these tournaments.
