= Canada (surname) =

Canada is a surname. Notable people with the surname include:

- Channing Canada (born 2002), American football player
- Cody Canada (born 1976), American country singer
- Geoffrey Canada (born 1952), American social activist and educator
- Jim Canada (1912–1975), American baseball player
- Jordin Canada (born 1995), American basketball player
- Larry Canada (1954–2021), American football player
- Matt Canada (born 1972), American football coach
- Ron Canada (born 1949), American actor
- Tom Canada (born 1980), American football player

== See also ==
- David Cañada (born 1975), Spanish cyclist
- Canaday, a surname
