= Finding the Fallen =

British television series

Finding the Fallen is a UK-based documentary TV series by Yap Productions developed for the History Channel / Discovery Channel in which a team of archaeologists, historians and forensic experts work to identify unknown World War I soldiers and finally lay them to rest.

== Concept ==
This UK original series developed by Yap Productions follows the work of 'The Trench Detectives' as they move through time and across the battlefields of France and Belgium, releasing the fallen from the mud of the battles in which they fought and died. Using geophysical surveys and wartime maps they try to locate the original trenches, finding bones, shreds of uniforms, personal effects and the remnants of war to help them identify the fallen soldiers. By doing so they reveal the personal histories of named soldiers and cast light on the human nature of war.

== Episodes ==
=== Series 1 ===
- Episode 1: Loos
- Episode 2: Passchendaele 1917: Drowning in Mud
- Episode 3: Serre 1915: Brothers in Death
- Episode 4: Ypres 1914: the First Trench
- Episode 5: Beaumont Hamel

=== Series 2 ===
- Episode 1: Barnardo Boy
- Episode 2: Man & Horse
- Episode 3: Secret Trench
- Episode 4: Codename “Tank”
- Episode 5: Buried Alive
- Episode 6: The Rings
- Episode 7: Silent Witness
- Episode 8: Highland Warrior

== Exhibition ==
To commemorate the Finding the Fallen series an exhibition was created by the experts at the National Army Museum. The exhibition, ran from November 2005 to February 2006, and depicted excavations, trench life, and how the investigation work led to identification.

"The exhibition gives historical insight into the Great War and looks at how the history of the battlefields and trenches of the war are really just inches below our feet. It also looks into how today’s forensic science and technology can help identify the missing and illustrates a real life case study of one of the identified soldiers from the series."

== DVD ==
A DVD set for season 1 is also available:

- Number of discs: 2
- Release Date: 11 June 2007
- Run Time: 250 minutes

The back cover reads:

”At the end of the First World War, nearly two million soldiers were missing, presumed dead.

Almost 90 years later, the once-bloody battlefields of Northern France and Belgium have given way to rolling countryside, and are surrendering their secrets. Beneath the farmlands lie the unknown and the unclaimed dead….

This DVD follows the dedicated team of archaeologists, forensic experts and historians known as No Man's Land as they seek to find, recover and identify the fallen of the Great War. Each episode in this complete five-part Discovery Channel series focuses in riveting detail on one archaeological dig at the site of a single significant battle of the Great War.

From the Belgian town of Ypres - where the team discover evidence of the very first trenches of the conflict - to the infamous German stronghold at Serre in Northern France, join the fascinating search using the latest battlefield archaeology and forensic techniques to recover and piece together the identity of those lost in the maelstrom of a long ago war. Other battlefields visited are Loos, the site of a hellish underground battle in 1915, Beaumont Hamel on the Somme and Passchendaele, where in 1917 the battlefield was transformed into a vast sea of liquid mud that swallowed up so many lives…
