= Karnataka benthamii =

Scientific classification
- Kingdom: Plantae
- Clade: Tracheophytes
- Clade: Angiosperms
- Clade: Eudicots
- Clade: Asterids
- Order: Apiales
- Family: Apiaceae
- Genus: Karnataka; P.K.Mukh. & Constance
- Species: K. benthamii

Binomial name
- Karnataka benthamii (C.B.Clarke) P.K.Mukh. & Constance

Synonyms
- Pimpinella benthamii (C.B.Clarke) M.R.Almeida; Pimpinella involucrata Miq. ex C.B.Clarke; Schulzia benthamii C.B.Clarke (1879) (basionym)

Species of flowering plant

Karnataka benthamii is a species of flowering plant in the family Apiaceae. It is a tuberous geophyte native to Maharashtra and Karnataka in western India. It is the sole species in genus Karnataka.
