= The Canadians (TV series) =

The Canadians is a biographical television show broadcast by History Television. The series was produced by Edmonton-based Great North Productions and each one-hour episode examines a historical Canadian. It was a flagship program for History Television and represented its largest editorial involvement at the time, and was also the broadcaster's first foray into educational products including CD-ROMs, web development and publishing, in partnership with the CRB Foundation.

Originally titled Faces of History, the first season of 16 one-hour episodes was overseen by commissioning editor Shelley Saywell and hosted by Laurier LaPierre. When LaPierre became chairman of Telefilm Canada, which provided funding for the series, he stepped down from hosting duties. The episodes from the first season were repackaged to match later seasons when shown in reruns.

For its second season of 14 episodes, producers changed the look of the show and gave it a more descriptive title, The Canadians: Biographies of a Nation. Patrick Watson, who had replaced Saywell as commissioning editor, took over as host and narrator.

== Biographical subjects ==
People who were profiled on the series include:

- William Aberhart (Bible Bill)
- W.A.C. Bennett
- Buzz Beurling
- Birdman
- Wilf Carter
- Marion de Chastelain
- Kit Coleman
- Louis Cyr
- Gabriel Dumont
- Bob Edwards
- Sir Sandford Fleming
- Northrop Frye
- Rose Fortune
- Alfred C. Fuller
- CD Howe
- Sir Sam Hughes
- Stewart James
- Pauline Johnson
- Klondike Kate
- Ruby Keeler
- La Bolduc
- Anna Leonowens
- Ruth Lowe
- Grant MacEwan
- Gunanoot
- Alexander Mackenzie
- Agnes Macphail
- Mandrake
- Louis B. Mayer
- Ada McCallum
- Bill Miner
- Emily Murphy
- Margaret "Ma" Murray
- Northern Dancer
- Marion Orr
- Grey Owl
- Mona Parsons
- Jacques Plante
- Francis Rattenbury
- Fred Rose
- Bobbie Rosenfeld
- Joseph Scriven
- Nell Shipman
- Jay Silverheels
- Joshua Slocum
- Sam Steele
- The Great Farini
- The Megantic Outlaw
- Tom Thomson
- Joseph Tyrrell
- Vladimir Valenta
- Georges Vanier
- Angus Walters
- John Ware
- Percy Williams

== Book ==
An accompanying 776-page book The Canadians: Biographies of a Nation, Volumes 1, 2, and 3 was published in 2003, with biographies of 60 Canadians. Watson is credited as the primary author with collaborators Patricia Phillips and Hugh Graham. In Canadian Book Review Annual, Patricia Morley described it as a "biographical treasure chest" of lively reading.
