= Morelos Cañada =

Coordinates: 19.3424°N 99.2007°W

Morelos Cañada is the municipal seat of Cañada Morelos Municipality in the eastern central region of the Mexican state of Puebla.
