= Kannada (disambiguation) =

Kannada is a language spoken predominantly by the people of Karnataka in India.

Kannada may also refeto:

- Kannada script, Indic script used to write the language
  - Kannada (Unicode block)
- Kannadigas or Kannada people, speakers of the language
- Kannada University, in India
- Uttara Kannada (lit. 'North Kannada'), a district of Karnataka, India
- Dakshina Kannada (lit. 'South Kannada'), a district of Karnataka, India

== See also ==
- Kanada (disambiguation)
- Karnataka (disambiguation)
- Canara (disambiguation)
- Carnatic (disambiguation)
- Cannada (disambiguation)
- Canada (disambiguation)
- Kaneda, a Japanese surname
