= RMS Empress of Canada =

RMS Empress of Canada may refer to one of the following ships of the Canadian Pacific Steamship Company:

- RMS Empress of Canada (1920), a 21,517-ton 653-foot (199 m) ship built in Glasgow, Scotland; Vancouver-based ship served the Far East; served as troopship in World War II; torpedoed and sunk off Africa by an Italian submarine in 1943; 392 of 1,800 aboard perished
- RMS Empress of Canada (1928), originally the Duchess of Richmond; served as troopship in World War II; renamed Empress of Canada in 1947; caught fire and capsized in Liverpool in 1953; scrapped the following year
- RMS Empress of Canada (1961), transatlantic liner providing service between Canada and the United Kingdom during the summer and cruising from New York City to the Caribbean in the winter; made 121 Atlantic crossings before being sold to Carnival Cruise Lines in 1971; later Mardi Gras, and Apollo

== See also ==
- Empress of Canada
