= Auschwitz 1940–1945 =

1995 book by Wacław Długoborski and Franciszek Piper

Auschwitz 1940–1945: Central Issues in the History of the Camp
- Editors: Wacław Długoborski and Franciszek Piper
- Original title: Auschwitz 1940–1945: Węzłowe zagadnienia z dziejów obozu
- Translator: William Brand
- Cover artist: Piotr Kutryba
- Language: Polish
- Subject: Auschwitz concentration camp, the Holocaust, Nazi crimes against the Polish nation
- Genre: History
- Publisher: Auschwitz-Birkenau State Museum
- Publication date: 1995
- Publication place: Poland
- English publication date: 2000
- Pages: 1,905 (English edition)
- ISBN: 83-85047-87-5
- Website: Auschwitz 1940–1945. Auschwitz-Birkenau State Museum.

Auschwitz 1940–1945: Central Issues in the History of the Camp is a five-volume monograph about the Auschwitz concentration camp in German-occupied Poland during World War II and the Holocaust. Written by researchers at the Auschwitz-Birkenau State Museum, it was first published by the museum in Polish in 1995 as Auschwitz 1940–1945: Węzłowe zagadnienia z dziejów obozu. An enlarged and updated German edition appeared in 1999, translated by Jochen August, and an English edition in 2000, translated by William Brand and partly funded by the U.S. Commission for the Preservation of America's Heritage Abroad. It appeared in French in 2004, and an enlarged and updated French edition was published in 2011.

The series editors, Wacław Długoborski and Franciszek Piper, are noted Holocaust historians; Piper is known, in particular, for having established widely accepted figures for the death toll within the camp. The other researchers are Danuta Czech (former deputy director of the museum), Tadeusz Iwaszko, Stanisław Kłodziński, Helena Kubica, Aleksander Lasik, Piotr Setkiewicz, Irena Strzelecka, Andrzej Strzelecki, and Henryk Świebocki. Several of the contributors, including Długoborski, were themselves prisoners in Auschwitz or had family members there.

The concept of the work was first discussed by the museum in 1979. The research is based on the State Museum Archives, which include 30,000 images; 15 metres of shelves of records from the camp's construction department (Bauleitung); and another 15 metres of documents from the camp itself, such as SS personnel files, 70,000 death certificates, watch books, letters from prisoners written inside the camp, telegrams about escapes, punishment books, and the daily roll call.

Irving Greenberg, then chair of the United States Holocaust Memorial Museum, described the work in 2001 as "by far the most comprehensive in its detail and level of source material". Reviewing it for Yad Vashem Studies, Joachim Neander noted "the authors' deep empathy with the victims" and called it "an academically solid compendium". Peter Hayes, writing in Holocaust and Genocide Studies, regarded the chapters as poorly organized, making it more suitable as a reference work than a readable history. He highlighted volume III by Franciszek Piper as "a masterful account" of the death toll.
