= Jane Haining =

Scottish missionary (1897–1944)

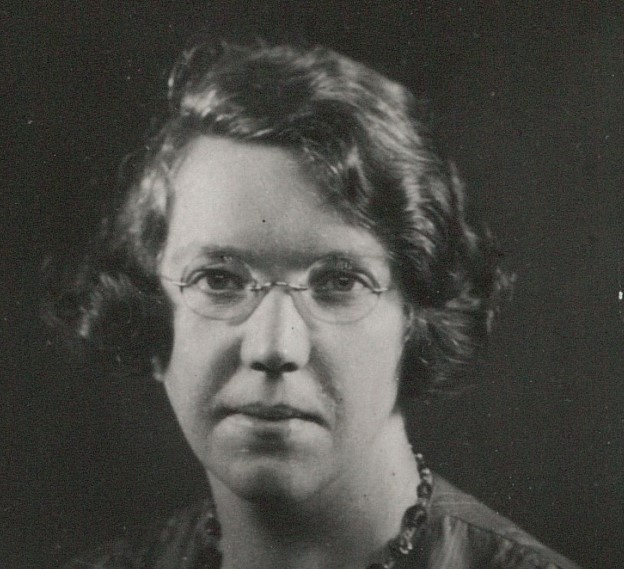
- Born: 6 June 1897; Dunscore, Dumfriesshire, Scotland
- Died: 17 July 1944 (aged 47); Auschwitz II-Birkenau, German-occupied Poland
- Cause of death: Unknown
- Occupation: Christian missionary in Hungary
- Years active: 1932–1944
- Employer: Church of Scotland
- Awards: Righteous among the Nations (1997); British Hero of the Holocaust (2010)

Jane Mathison Haining (6 June 1897 – 17 July 1944) (Note: Danuta Czech (Auschwitz, 1940–1945. Central Issues in the History of the Camp, Volume V, 2000): "July 17 [1944]: Prisoner Jane Haining (serial number 79467, born June 6, 1897), a British citizen and director of the Scottish Institute in Budapest, died in Birkenau. She had been arrested in late April, 1944, on suspicion of spying for Britain, and sent to Auschwitz on May 15.") was a Scottish missionary for the Church of Scotland in Budapest, Hungary, who was recognised in 1997 by Yad Vashem in Israel as Righteous Among the Nations for having risked her life to help Jews during the Holocaust. (Note: Yad Vashem: "In March 1944, Germany occupied Hungary and soon began to deport the Jews from the Hungarian provinces. Haining was not deterred and stood by her students with great bravery, exposing herself to danger.")

Haining worked in Budapest from June 1932 as matron of a boarding house for Jewish and Christian girls in a school run by the Scottish Mission to the Jews. (Note: Mitchell Leslie Glaser (Fuller Theological Seminary, 1998): "A mission to the Jews is an organization that has as its primary focus the evangelization of the Jewish people, although its activities may include ministries that are not directly evangelistic, including discipleship training, spiritual nurture, congregational planting, literature production, medical and educational work.") In or around 1940, after the outbreak of World War II in 1939, the Church of Scotland advised Haining to return to Britain, but she decided to stay in Hungary.

After Germany invaded Hungary in March 1944, the SS began arranging the deportation of the country's Jews to Auschwitz II-Birkenau, the German extermination camp in occupied Poland. (Note: Of the estimated 1.3 million people sent to Auschwitz between 1940 and 1945, at least 1.1 million died, around 90 per cent of them Jews. Of the over 437,000 Hungarian Jews deported to Auschwitz between May and July 1944, 90 per cent were sent on arrival to the gas chambers.) Arrested by the Gestapo in April 1944 on a variety of charges, Haining was herself deported to Auschwitz-Birkenau in May. She died there two months later.

Little is known about Haining's work in Budapest or death in Auschwitz. In 1949 a Scottish minister, the Reverend David McDougall (1889–1964), editor of the Jewish Mission Quarterly, published a 21-page booklet about her, Jane Haining of Budapest. According to Jennifer Robertson, writing in 2014 for PRISM: An Interdisciplinary Journal for Holocaust Educators, almost all subsequent publications about Haining depend on McDougall's booklet.

== Early life ==
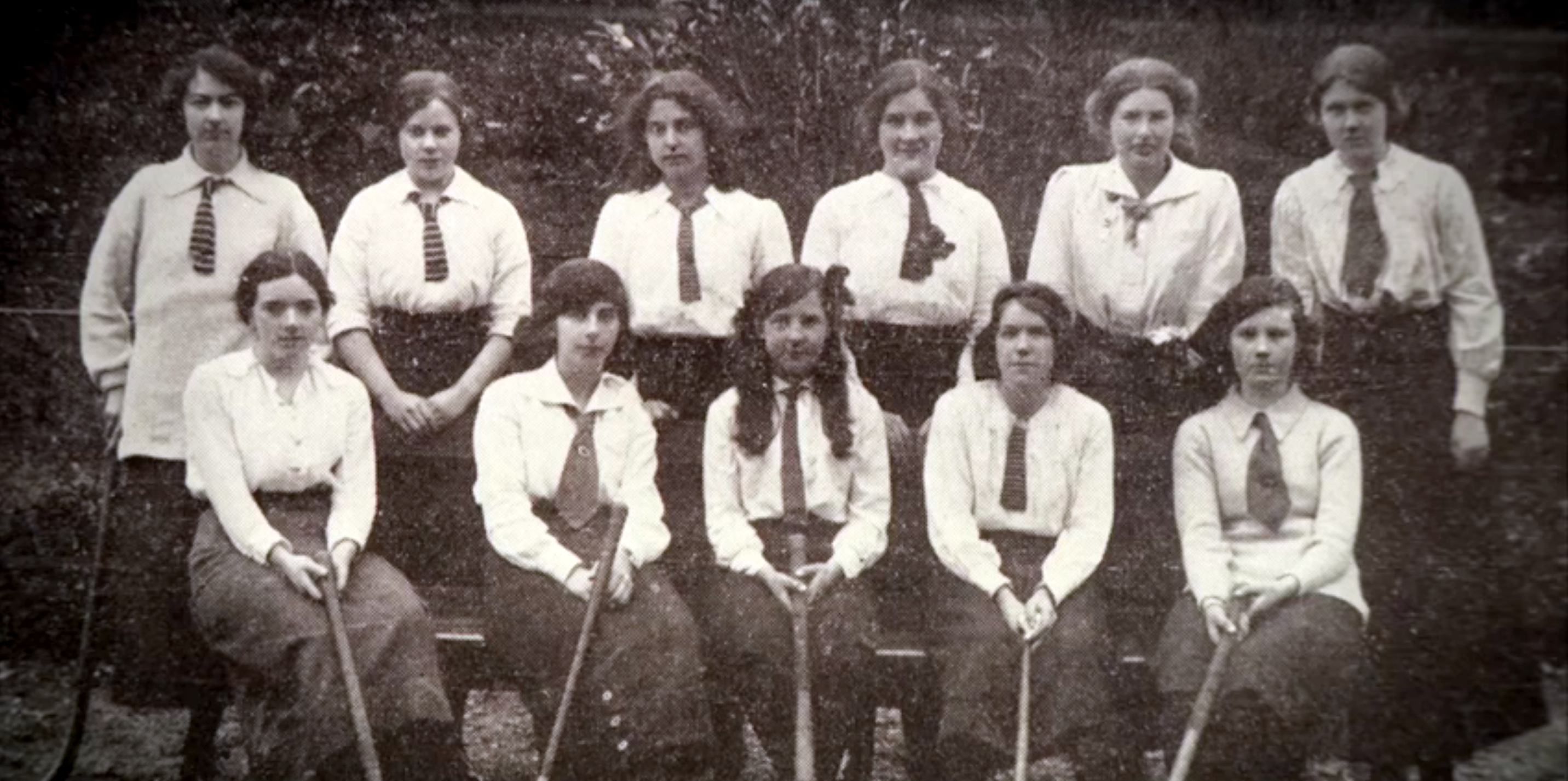
Haining (seated, second right) at Dumfries Academy

Born at Lochenhead Farm in Dunscore, Dumfriesshire, Scotland, Haining was the fifth child of Jane Mathison and her husband, Thomas John Haining, a farmer, who had married in 1890. Mathison, herself from a farming family, died in 1902 while giving birth to the couple's sixth child, when Haining was about five. Haining's father remarried in January 1922 and died that June. Toward the end of the year, his second wife, Robertina Maxwell, gave birth to a daughter, Agnes.

Haining grew up as a member of the evangelical Craig Church in Dunscore, part of the United Free Church of Scotland. (Note: Craig Church in Dunscore belonged to the United Free Church of Scotland from 1900. It had belonged to the Reformed Presbyterian Church of Scotland until 1876, and thereafter the Free Church of Scotland until 1900.) Educated at Dunscore village school, she won a scholarship to Dumfries Academy in 1909, as her older sisters Alison and Margaret had done, where she lived as a boarder in the Moat Hostel for Girls. She graduated as the school dux, one of 41 school prizes she was awarded, and left with Highers in English, French, German, Latin and Mathematics.

== Career ==
=== Secretarial work, retraining ===
After graduating, Haining trained at the Athenaeum Commercial College in Glasgow, and from 1917 until 1927 worked in Paisley for J. and P. Coats Ltd, a thread manufacturer, first as a clerk, then as secretary to the private secretary. During this period, she lived at 90 Forth Street, Pollokshields, Glasgow, and attended the nearby Queen's Park West United Free Church, where she taught Sunday School. According to Nan Potter, who attended the classes, Haining would buy the children cream buns for tuppence ha'penny. It was around this time that she became interested in becoming a missionary. In 1927 she attended a meeting in Glasgow of the Jewish Mission Committee and heard Rev. Dr. George Mackenzie, chair of the committee, discuss his missionary work. She reportedly told a friend "I have found my lifework!"

Her manager at work was ill at the time, so Haining stayed with Coats for another five months, then another year while he trained her replacement. There followed a one-year diploma course at the Glasgow College of Domestic Science, which gave her a qualification in domestic science and housekeeping. She took a temporary post in Glasgow, then in Manchester as a matron. In or around 1932 she responded to an advertisement in the Church of Scotland magazine Life and Work, looking for a matron for the girls' hostel attached to its Jewish mission school in Budapest. The majority of the United Free Church of Scotland had united with the Church of Scotland in 1929.

=== Scottish mission ===
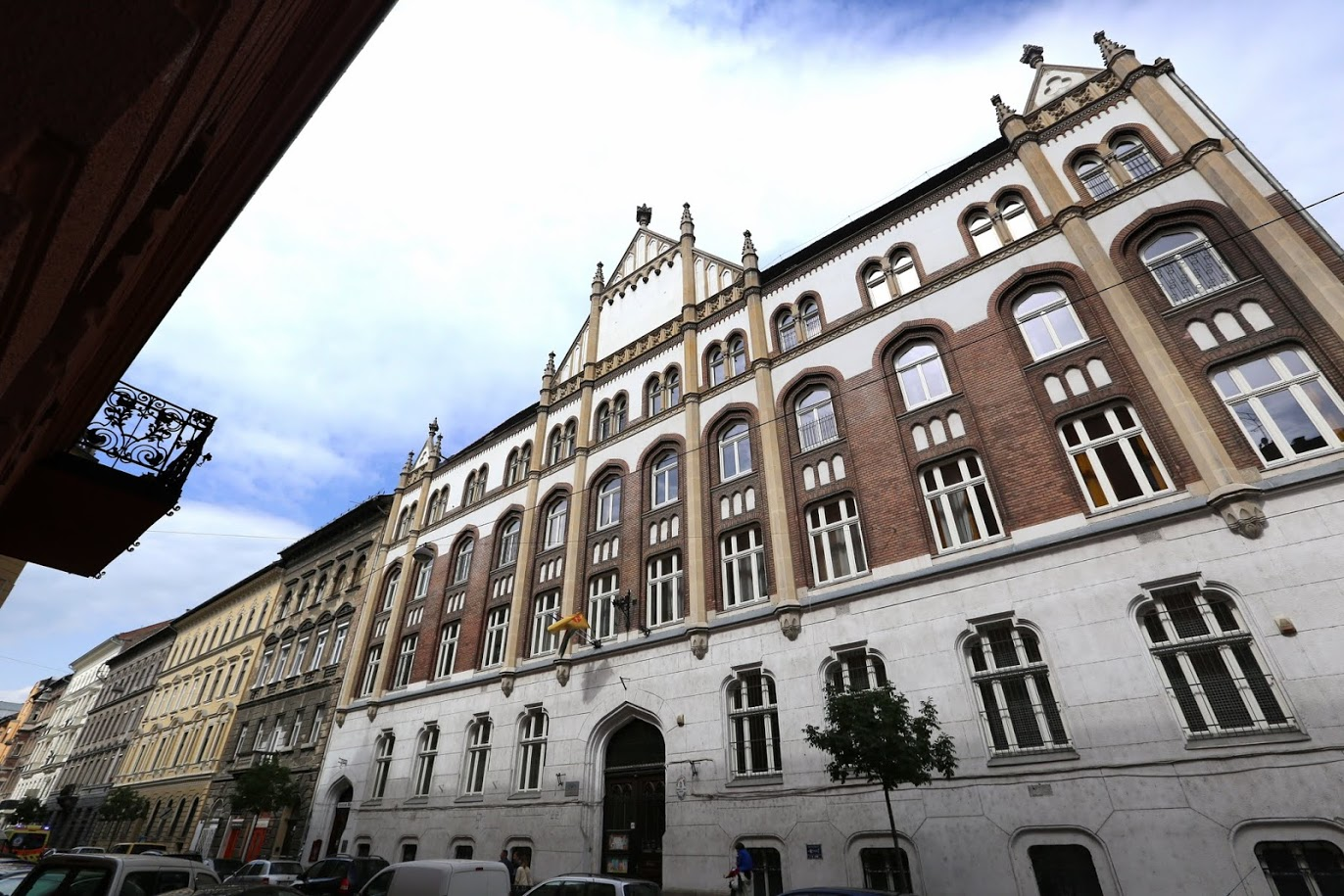
The Scottish Mission, Vörösmarty utca 51, Budapest, 2017

The Jewish mission ran a school for both Jewish and Christian girls in its mission building at 51 Vörösmarty Street. The Church of Scotland had established the mission, also known as St Columba's Church, in 1841 to evangelise Hungarian Jews. The founding ministers, Alexander Black and Alexander Keith, along with Andrew Bonar and Robert Murray M'Cheyne, had been making their way to Jerusalem to spread Christianity, when Black is reported to have injured himself falling from his camel, as a result of which he and Keith decided to return to Scotland. They did so via Budapest, where their stay became protracted when Keith fell ill. The Archduchess Dorothea of Austria befriended them there, and the men were persuaded to establish a Scottish mission in that city.

=== Work for the mission ===
The Jewish mission committee sent Haining for further training at St Colm's Women's Missionary College in Edinburgh. Her dedication service took place at St Stephen's Church, Edinburgh, on 19 June 1932, during a service presided over by the chair of the Jewish mission committee, Dr. Stewart Thompson. Haining left for Budapest the next day, seven months before Adolf Hitler became Chancellor of Germany on 30 January 1933.

The girls' home was on the third floor of the Vörösmarty Street mission building, and consisted of two bedrooms with about 16 girls in each room, as of 1932. Most of the students were Jews. McDougall wrote in 1949: "Not all the girls were Jewesses however, for it was considered wise to have a proportion of Christian girls among them."

Haining wrote that the school had 400 pupils ranging from six to 16; 30–40 of them were boarders, either live-in or day boarders. These were the girls for whom Haining was responsible. Although Hungarian law did not allow religious conversion before the age of 18, she wrote, the school aimed to prepare its Jewish students for conversion to Christianity. The daily Bible lesson for all pupils included study of the New Testament. Haining made efforts to have part of the building converted to club rooms, so that the evangelical work could continue for girls who had left the school, as most did when they were 14 or 15.

=== World War II ===
When World War II broke out on 3 September 1939, Haining was on holiday in Cornwall with Margit Prém, the Hungarian head of the mission's elementary school. The women returned immediately to Budapest. They had hoped to take Haining's sister Agnes back with them for a visit, but the war changed their plans. According to McDougall, Haining wrote to someone: "The journey back was a nightmare—five changes, no porters, no hot food, crowded trains like Bank Holiday plus luggage, no sanitary conveniences fit to mention, two nights spent on the platform beside, or on, our luggage." In 1940 the Church of Scotland missions committee in Edinburgh advised her to return to Scotland, but according to McDougall she felt safe in Hungary and decided to stay. He mentioned her briefly in his book In Search of Israel (1941): "Miss Haining, the matron of the girls' home, stayed on after the others, and she is there still. By roundabout ways we hear from her sometimes." She wrote to someone shortly after the outbreak of war:

However I am glad to say we are shaking down into something like order, although it was a month after I came back before I was able to have one complete afternoon off duty ... The children are gradually getting into harness and I am having time to miss the letters which do not come. Of the war it is better not to speak and indeed there is nothing to say in a letter. Hungary is neutral and anxious to remain so, so we, who are enjoying her hospitality, are refraining from talking politics.

From then on, particularly from 1941, Jewish refugees from all over German-occupied Europe began arriving in Hungary to escape the Holocaust. (Note: In its 1941 census, Hungary recorded 725,005 Jews, 4.94 per cent of a population of 14,683,323. Another 100,000 Christians were identified as of Jewish origin or "racial Jews". Despite the country's antisemitism, it was at that point (before March 1944) still relatively safe for Jews compared to its neighbours.) According to McDougall, Haining wrote to someone in or around 1938: "What a ghastly feeling it must be to know that no one wants you and to feel that your neighbours literally grudge you your daily bread." According to one colleague, she would rise at 5 am on market days to find food for the home and would carry the heavy bags back herself. She is reported to have cut up her leather suitcase to repair the girls' shoes. A pupil at the school told a filmmaker decades later: "We understood even as third-graders, that we are protected here, we are not harmed, we are protected, and we are equals. We could see, we could understand this, because they behaved accordingly."

Rev. George Knight, the mission's superintendent, wrote in 1944, after Haining's death: "During those awful years of the 'war of nerves,' when refugees were pouring out of Germany into the comparative safety of Hungary, the Mission staff spent a hectic time attempting to aid those émigrés to continue their flight to Great Britain and the Western Hemisphere. We established a training school for prospective domestic servants and Miss Haining ... gave courses of lectures to Jewish refugees on British conditions."

=== German invasion of Hungary ===
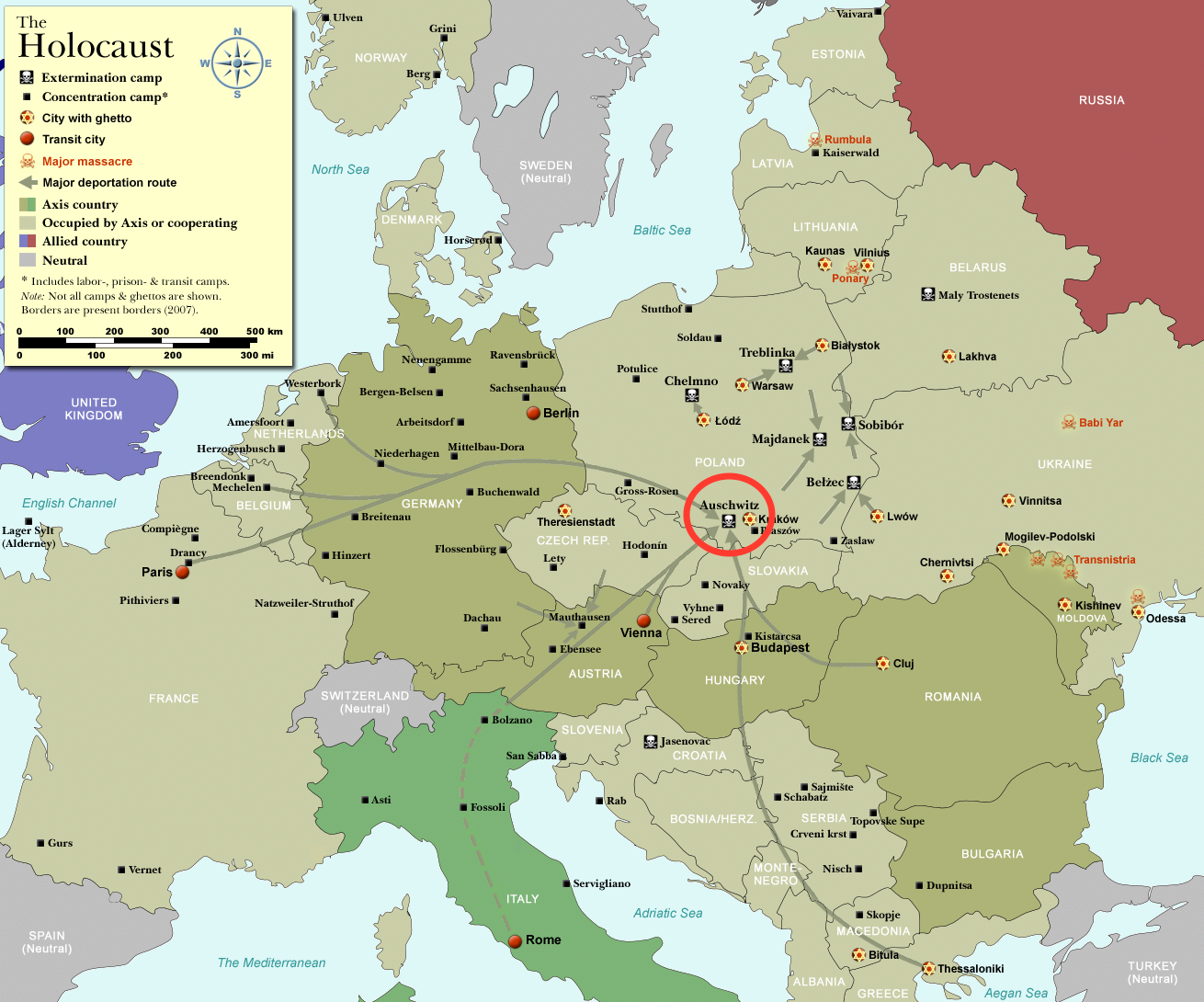
Concentration camps and ghettos in occupied Europe (2007 borders); Auschwitz is circled in red.

On 19 March 1944, Germany invaded Hungary, and the SS immediately began arranging for the country's Jews to be deported to Auschwitz. SS-Obersturmbannführer Adolf Eichmann and his Sondereinsatzkommando Ungarn ("special intervention unit Hungary") arrived in Budapest to take charge of the deportations. On 31 March a range of anti-Jewish restrictions were introduced, in force as of 5 April: Jews were forbidden from owning cars and radios, using telephones, moving home, wearing school uniform, or using public baths, swimming pools, public restaurants, cafes, bars or catering services. They had to declare any property except for a small amount of household items. Jewish lawyers, civil servants, and journalists were sacked, non-Jews were not allowed to work in Jewish households, books by Jews could not be published, and those already in existence could not be borrowed from libraries.

Jews over the age of six were required to wear a 10 × 10 cm yellow badge in the shape of the Star of David on the left chest of their outer clothing. Following the decree, Jews would be arrested for petty issues, such as wearing a star of the wrong size. In mid-April 1944 the SS began herding them into holding areas, including ghettos and brick factories, where they were held for weeks with little to eat.

== Arrest ==
=== Charges ===
The Church of Scotland Jewish mission committee in Edinburgh wrote to the British Foreign Office around the time of the invasion of Hungary that it was "under a very deep debt of gratitude to Miss Jane Haining ... By her personal influence and faithfulness she has inspired such loyalty that the Budapest [Jewish] Mission has maintained its former high standards. Recent events have seriously altered the situation and the thoughts of the Church will be with [her] and her colleagues in the new difficulties that have arisen."

In late April or early May 1944 (25 April, according to Bishop László Ravasz of the Reformed Church in Hungary), (Note: According to David McDougall, Haining was arrested in early May 1944; according to Bishop László Ravasz of the Reformed Church in Hungary, in a letter to the Scottish Mission in or around 1946, she was arrested on 25 April.) (Note: Bishop László Ravasz, Reformed Church in Hungary (1946): "On the 25th April, 1944, the agents of the Gestapo arrested and carried away Miss Haining, the matron of the Girls’ Home of the Scottish Mission. For her release I requested the support of the Regent, who learned of the case with deep regret and assured me of his sympathy for the Church of Scotland and all her workers. "Then, along with State Secretary Mr. Miklos Mester, I called on the Prime Minister [of Hungary] and begged him to make the strongest intervention for the release of Miss Haining. The Prime Minister, as the Minister for Foreign Affairs, accordingly instructed his substitute, the Under Secretary, and I have no reason whatever to doubt that the Under Secretary took the due steps. But to my request I received no reply. "A final and sorrowful reply was a package which was delivered at the end of July to the Scottish Mission, and from which it could be ascertained that Miss Haining lost her life in a German concentration camp. "The Hungarian Reformed Church surrounded with sympathy and high esteem this frail and heroic-spirited lady. Her superiors had three times insisted on her to go home, but she had always declined. Twofold are our griefs: being ourselves captives, we were not able to save her; and being trodden down, we had no power to stand up for her more effectively." For information about Bishop Ravasz, see "Dr. Laszlo Ravasz, Hungarian Bishop". The New York Times. 30 August 1975.) two officers from the Gestapo (the German secret police) arrived at the mission home to arrest Haining. They searched her office and bedroom, and gave her 15 minutes to pack. According to one colleague's diary entry on 30 April 1944, Haining was "now in the cellars of Police HQ. I asked [the consulate] why and was told that a charwoman denounced her of having a secret radio receiver". She was at first held in a house used by the Gestapo in the Buda Hills, before being moved to Fő utca ("Main Street") prison. Her friends took her weekly parcels of food and clean underwear. According to a fellow prisoner, Miss Frances W. Lee, as told by David McDougall in 1949 (Lee survived the war and moved to New Zealand), Haining was questioned twice and had the following charges put to her:

- That she had worked among the Jews.
- That she had wept when putting yellow stars on the girls.
- That she had dismissed her housekeeper, who was an Aryan.
- That she had listened to the news broadcasts of the B.B.C.
- That she had many British visitors.
- That she was active in politics.
- That she visited British prisoners of war.
- That she sent them parcels.

According to McDougall, Haining had been given permission by the Hungarian government to visit British prisoners of war, and she had indeed sent them parcels. After admitting the charges, except for the allegation of political activity, Haining was moved to the Kistarcsa transit camp. Her friends arrived at the Fő utca prison with food and clean underwear, but she had gone. Frances Lee wrote in July 1945 to Dr. Laszlo Nagy of the Hungarian Reformed Church:

I remember very clearly the day she brought this list [of charges] from the Svabhegy prison where she had been "questioned": She read them out laughingly to me saying she had felt such a "stupid" repeating Ja, es ist wahr ["Yes, it is true"], after each accusation, except the sixth (that she had been involved in politics). She said she had been too busy to occupy herself with politics. Yes, she had wept, and again began to weep. ... After 17 days in prison, she was taken away but left in very good health and spirits. We all felt sure she was going to a pleasant outdoor camp. Little did I realize I would never see her again. ... She endeared herself to all her fellow-prisoners and everybody wept when she left.

Bishop László Ravasz told the Scottish Mission in 1946 that he had tried to obtain support for Haining from Admiral Miklós Horthy, the Regent of Hungary, who, Ravasz said, "learned of the case with deep regret and assured me of his sympathy for the Church of Scotland and all her workers". Ravasz also spoke to or met with the State Secretary Miklos Mester and the Hungarian prime minister, who, at the time of Haining's arrest, was Döme Sztójay. Ravasz understood that the prime minister had instructed an under-secretary to seek Haining's release, but Ravasz received no further reply to his inquiries.

=== Mass deportations to Auschwitz ===
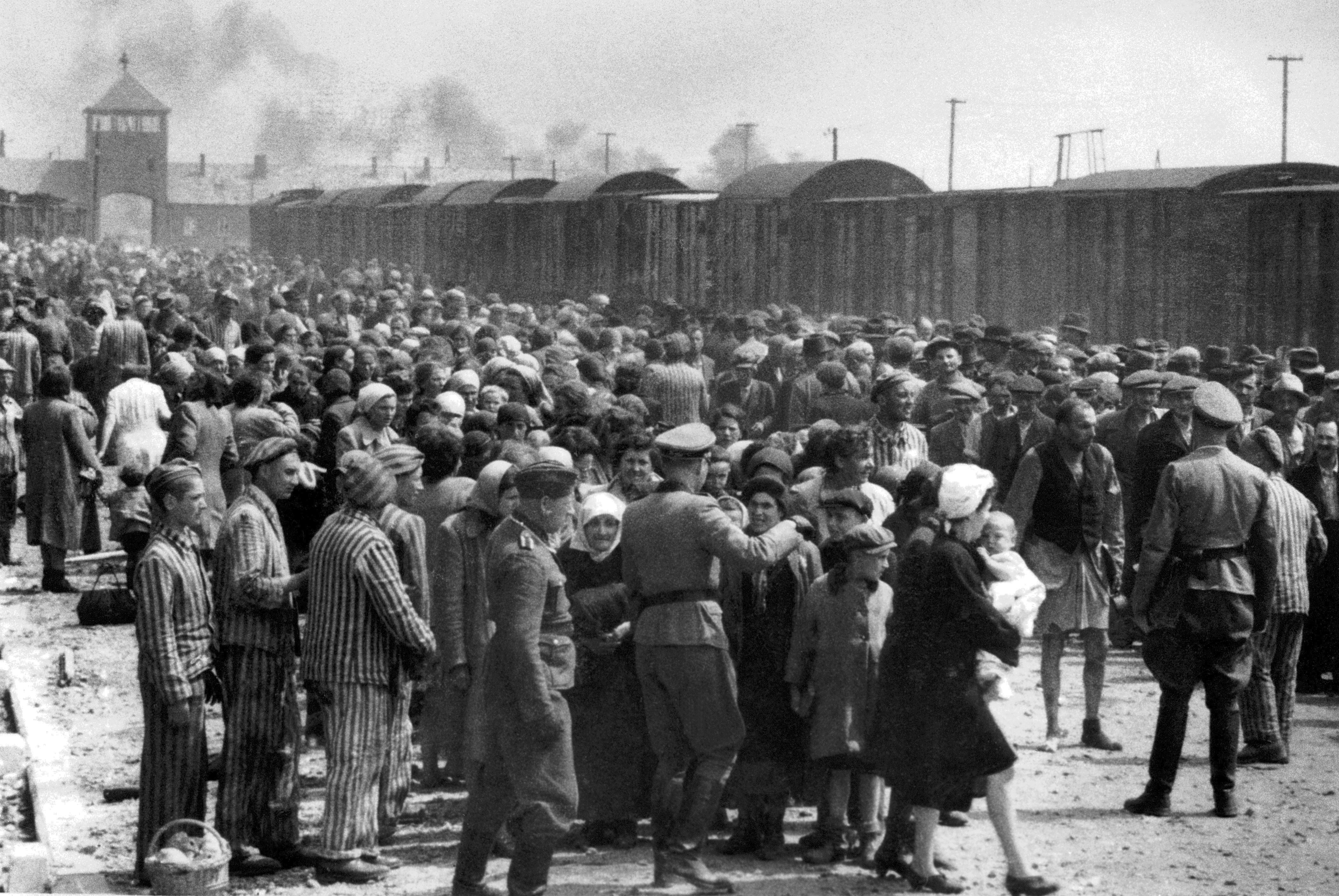
Hungarian Jews arrive at Auschwitz II-Birkenau, c. May 1944. The gatehouse is visible in the background.

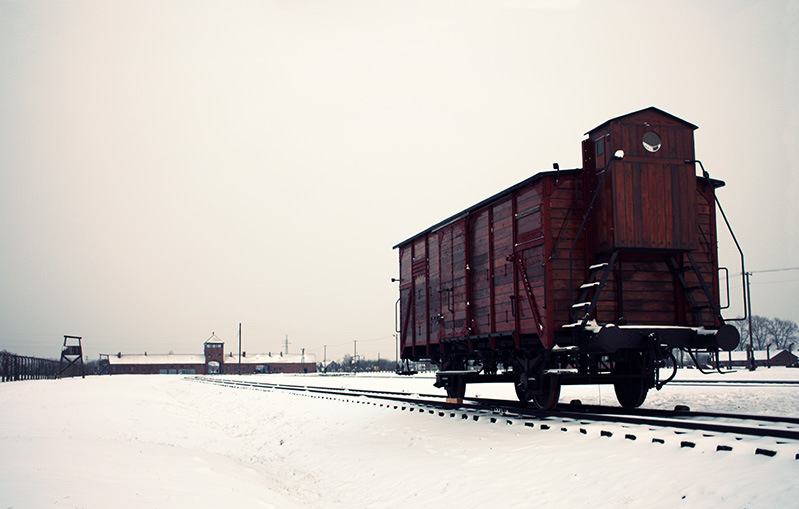
The gatehouse in 2014

In April 1944, the Germans began deporting Hungary's Jews to the German extermination camp Auschwitz II-Birkenau in occupied Poland. The mass transports began on 15 May. Between then and 9 July 1944, the SS deported the Jewish community in closed goods wagons at a rate of 12,000 a day. According to Edmund Veesenmayer, Hitler's minister in Hungary, 437,402 Hungarian Jews were deported, constituting almost the entire Jewish population of Hungary's countryside. Deportees were taken in Hungarian trains to the Slovak border, then transferred to German trains to be taken to southern Poland, a journey of about two days. Squeezed into the wagons in horrendous conditions, with little air, light, food or water, with buckets for latrines and no privacy, many people died during the journey. Gertrud "Trude" Levi was deported from Hungary to Auschwitz in 1944:

The normal load for the trucks was 60–90 people, we were 120 ... We had two buckets for our human needs, we had to overcome our inhibitions to use them—men, women, strangers, children ... [W]ith every jolt of the train the muck ran out so we were sitting in it and we couldn't do a thing about it. This was June 1944, a very hot summer and there was very little air in the truck. The two openings had barbed wire over them and the air became really unbearable. ... [W]e were getting thirstier and thirstier ... you were hungry, you had a piece of bread in your hand but couldn't eat it because you couldn't swallow any more. It meant people went into hysterics, people went mad, people had heart attacks, and people died. And we had the dead, the mad, the hysterical and the screaming among us and we could not do a thing about it.

From May 1944 the trains into Auschwitz II arrived on a new train spur that had been built to carry the Hungarian Jews directly into the camp. The three-track line, which stopped near the gas chambers, meant that a new train could arrive while a previous one was being unloaded. The crematoria could barely cope; the Sonderkommando (prisoners forced to work there) had to start burning bodies in open fire pits. About 90 per cent of the Hungarian Jews who survived the journey to Auschwitz were sent to the gas chambers on arrival; the rest were selected for slave labour.

=== Haining's deportation, final letter ===
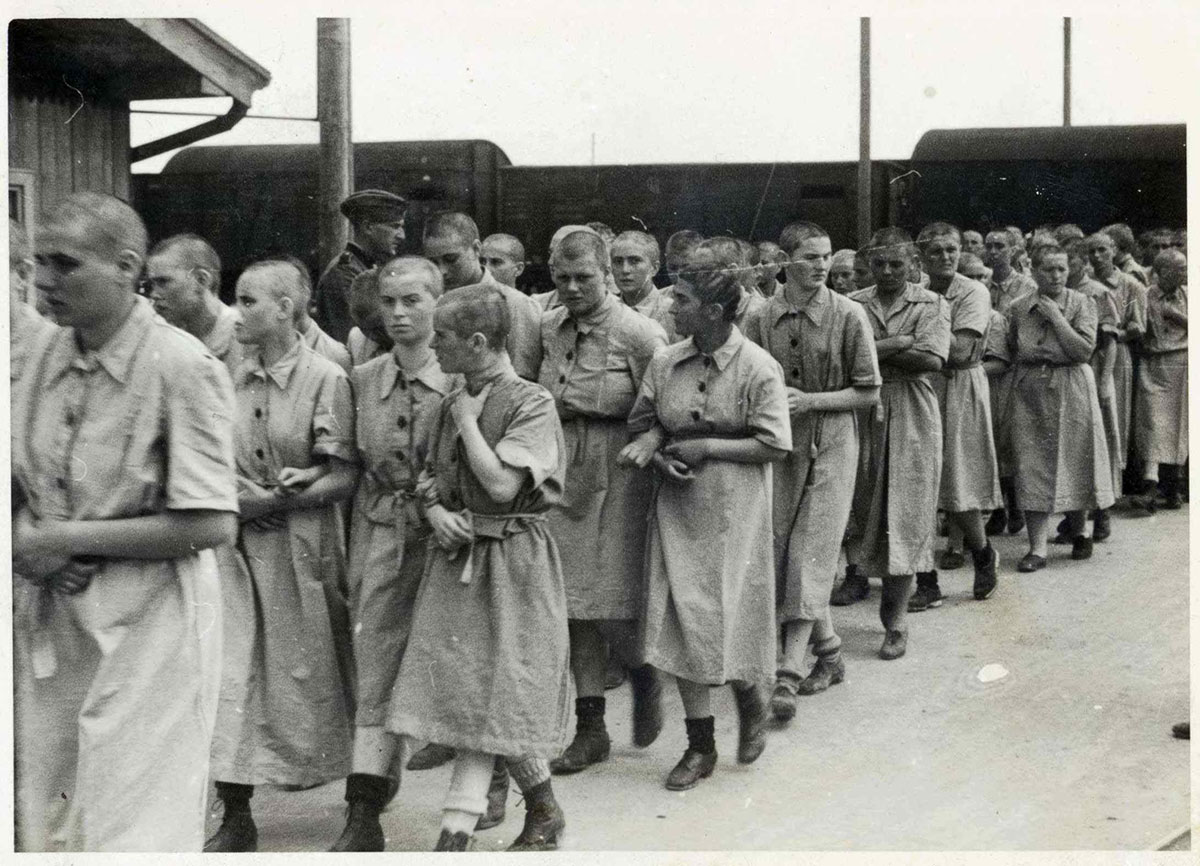
Female prisoners in Auschwitz II-Birkenau, c. May 1944

According to the Polish historian Danuta Czech, Haining was deported to Auschwitz II on 15 May 1944. According to David McDougall, she was taken to Auschwitz along with 90 other prisoners from the Kistarcsa transit camp. One former pupil said that many of the Jewish girls from the Scottish mission also ended up in Auschwitz; a few survived.

Selected for work rather than the gas chamber, Haining was given the serial number 79467 and probably had the number tattooed on her arm. She sent a postcard from Auschwitz, written in German, to Margit Prém of the mission school. (The card was forwarded on 1 August 1956 to the Church of Scotland's Department of World Mission.) Postmarked "Auschwitz, Oberschlesien", 21 July 1944, one side is headed "Konzentrationslager Auschwitz" ("Auschwitz concentration camp") and lists the rules for corresponding with prisoners. The other side is dated 15 July 1944, written in pencil:

My dearest Margit! I have not yet had an answer to my first letter, but I know there is nothing you can do about that. I'll repeat it briefly, in case by any chance you haven't received it. You're allowed to write to me twice a month, and I'm allowed to write once a month, but only to you. Packages are not restricted by number or name. I asked you to register me with our Red Cross, but I should like it if you could possibly send me apples or other fresh fruit and biscuits, rusks and other kinds of bread, as of course the Red Cross doesn't send things like that. ... Your loving Jean

=== Death ===
According to a death certificate that arrived in Edinburgh on 17 August 1944, Haining died in hospital, presumably in Auschwitz, on 17 July 1944, two days after the date written in pencil on her card to Margit Prém. Delivered courtesy of the German legation in Budapest and the Swiss government, the death certificate stated: "Miss Haining who was arrested on account of justified suspicion of espionage against Germany, died in hospital, July 17th, of cachexia following intestinal catarrh." Her death was probably as a result of starvation and the camp's catastrophic living conditions. In June 1946, the Church of Scotland magazine Life and Work reported that the Scottish Mission in Budapest had received a letter about Haining from Bishop Ravasz in Budapest, describing his efforts in 1944 to bring her arrest to the attention of the Hungarian government. The final response he received was "a package which was delivered at the end of July to the Scottish Mission, and from which it could be ascertained that Miss Haining lost her life in a German concentration camp". Bishop Ravasz added to his letter:

The Hungarian Reformed Church surrounded with sympathy and high esteem this frail and heroic-spirited lady. Her superiors had three times insisted on her to go home, but she had always declined. Twofold are our griefs: being ourselves captives, we were not able to save her; and being trodden down, we had no power to stand up for her more effectively.

Haining's Bible was found in the mission home after the war, and is on display in the mission building. Some of her belongings were found in 2016 in the attic space of the Church of Scotland's head office in George Street, Edinburgh. They included her handwritten will, dated July 1942, and over 70 photographs of the girls in the mission school. The items were placed in the National Library of Scotland.

== Memorials ==
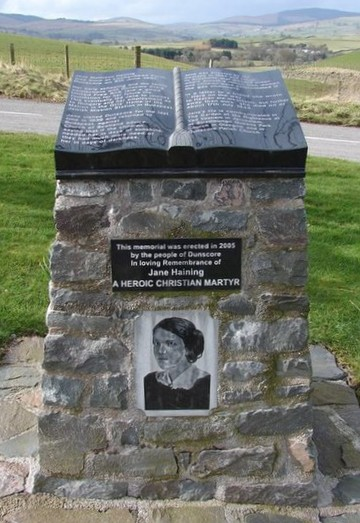
Memorial in Dunscore, Haining's home village

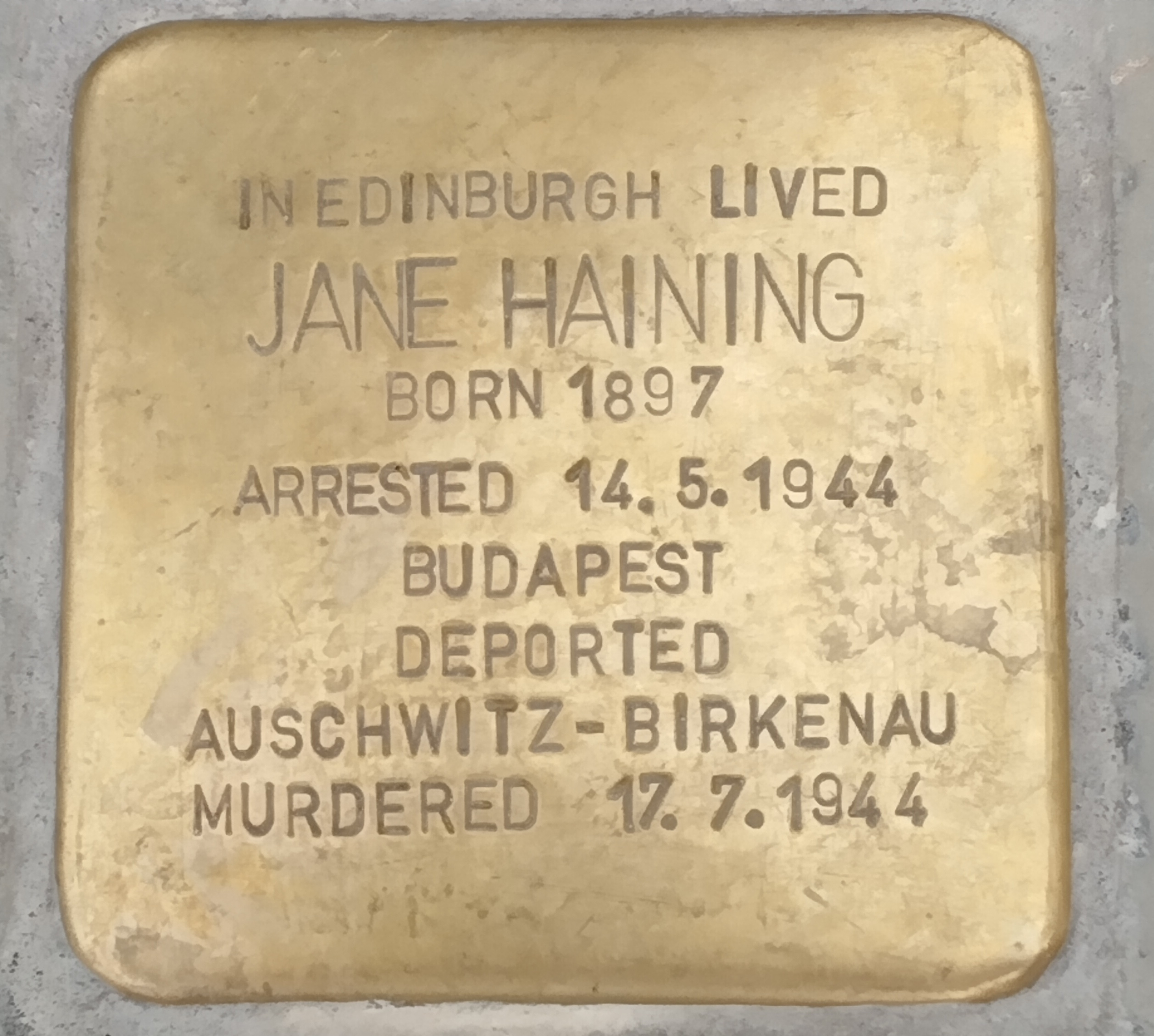
Stolperstein (stumbling block) for Haining in Edinburgh (2025)

Little was known about Auschwitz when Haining died. Robertson writes that a 1944 Church of Scotland report stated that she had been sent to a "detention camp for women in Auschwitz in Upper Silesia", and her family's tombstone in the Irongray churchyard near Castle Douglas placed her death in Germany. The Scottish Mission in Budapest unveiled a memorial tablet for her in 1946. In June 1948 two stained glass windows in her honour were installed in the vestibule of Queen's Park Govanhill Parish Church in Glasgow, where she worshipped.

On 27 January 1997—International Holocaust Remembrance Day and the 52nd anniversary of the liberation of Auschwitz—Yad Vashem, Israel's Holocaust memorial, recognised Haining as Righteous Among the Nations. Her name is inscribed on a wall of honour in the Garden of the Righteous in Jerusalem. The honour is awarded to non-Jews who risked their lives to save Jews during the Holocaust. Twenty-two British people had been recognised as of January 2018. Haining was the second Scot; Tommy Noble, a Scottish POW, was made Righteous Among the Nations in 1988.

Other memorials to Haining include a cairn near Dunscore Church, made possible in 2005 by public donation, and a Church of Scotland "Jane Haining prize", which arranges an annual visit to Scotland for a Hungarian teacher and two students. In 2010 the city of Budapest renamed a section of an embankment after her: Pesti alsó rakpart (Pest-side lower embankment, along the Danube between the Széchenyi Chain Bridge and Elizabeth Bridge) became Jane Haining rakpart. Also in 2010, the British government named her a British Hero of the Holocaust. In 2016, a memorial event attended by former pupils of the mission school was held in Hungary and in 2017 Haining was again honoured by the city of Budapest in a new exhibition at its Holocaust Memorial Centre.

Karine Polwart, the Scottish singer-songwriter, wrote a song about Haining entitled "Baleerie Baloo" (named after the Scottish lullaby Baloo Baleerie) for her 2006 album, Scribbled in Chalk. In 2009 Raymond Raszkowski Ross based a play on her life, A Promised Land, and New Zealand journalist Lynley Smith wrote a fictionalised diary, From Matron to Martyr (2012), based on Haining's life. In 2016 Haining was named in the video accompanying "Girl (Daughter of Scotland)", a Scottish women's anthem by Sharon Martin. BBC Scotland poet-in-residence Stuart A. Paterson wrote a tribute to Haining for National Holocaust Memorial Day 2018, "In Days of Darkness".

Seventy-five years after her death the Church of Scotland's Life and Work magazine reprinted its 1946 article about her dedication and death: 'A Gallant Lady' who 'Faced the Gestapo'.

On 10 June 2021, the Scottish Episcopal Church at its General Synod voted to include Haining in its calendar of saints and heroes. She will be remembered on 17 July. A brass stolperstein has been placed outside St Stephen's Church in Stockbridge, Edinburgh, in Haining's memory unveiled in Edinburgh in November 2025 in a ceremony attended by members of her family. The church had held a service for her in 1932 before she left for her work as a matron in Budapest.

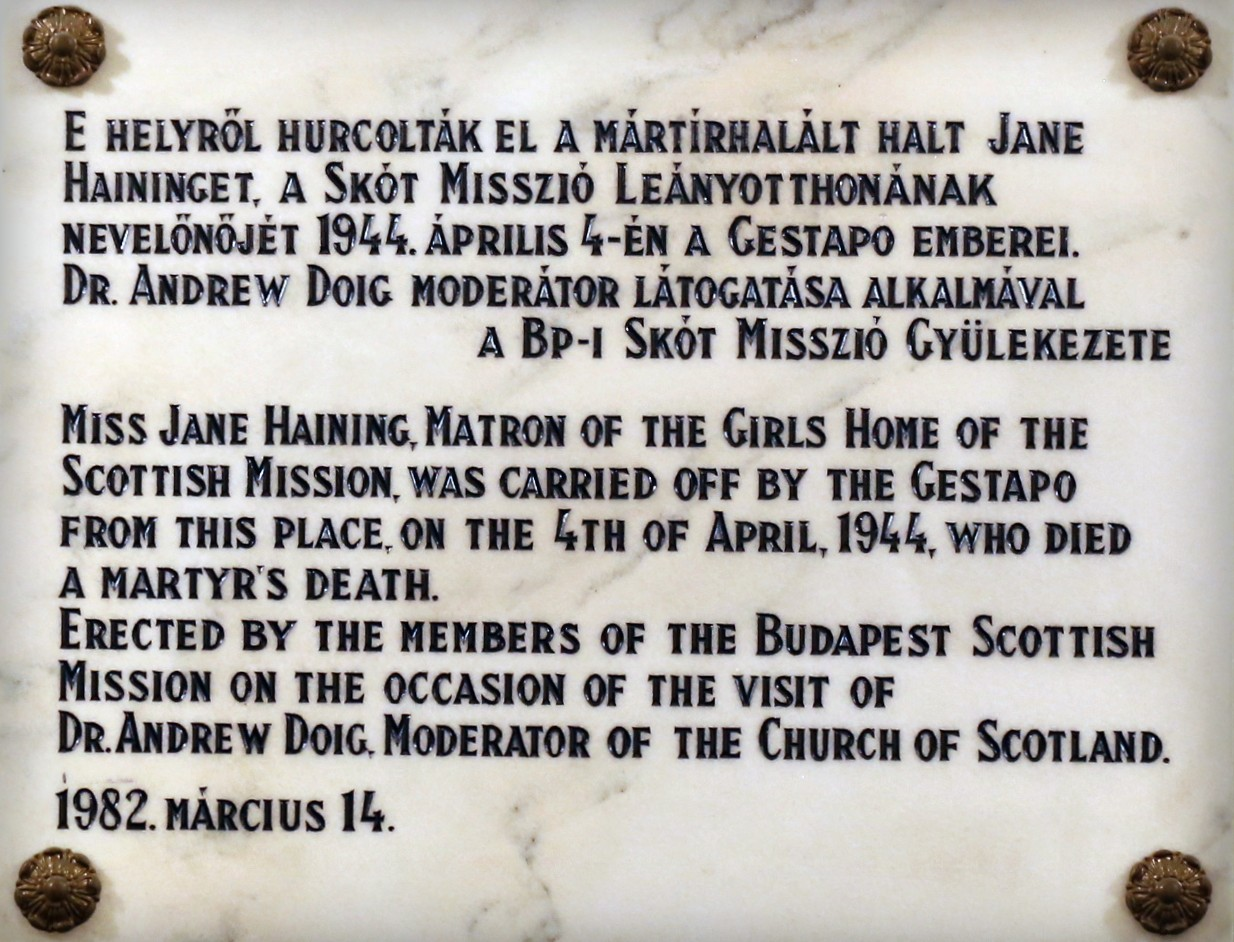
Plaque at the Scottish Mission, Budapest

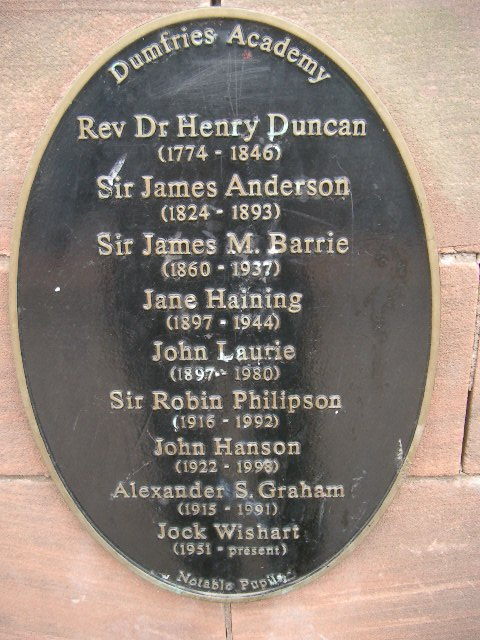
Plaque at Dumfries Academy

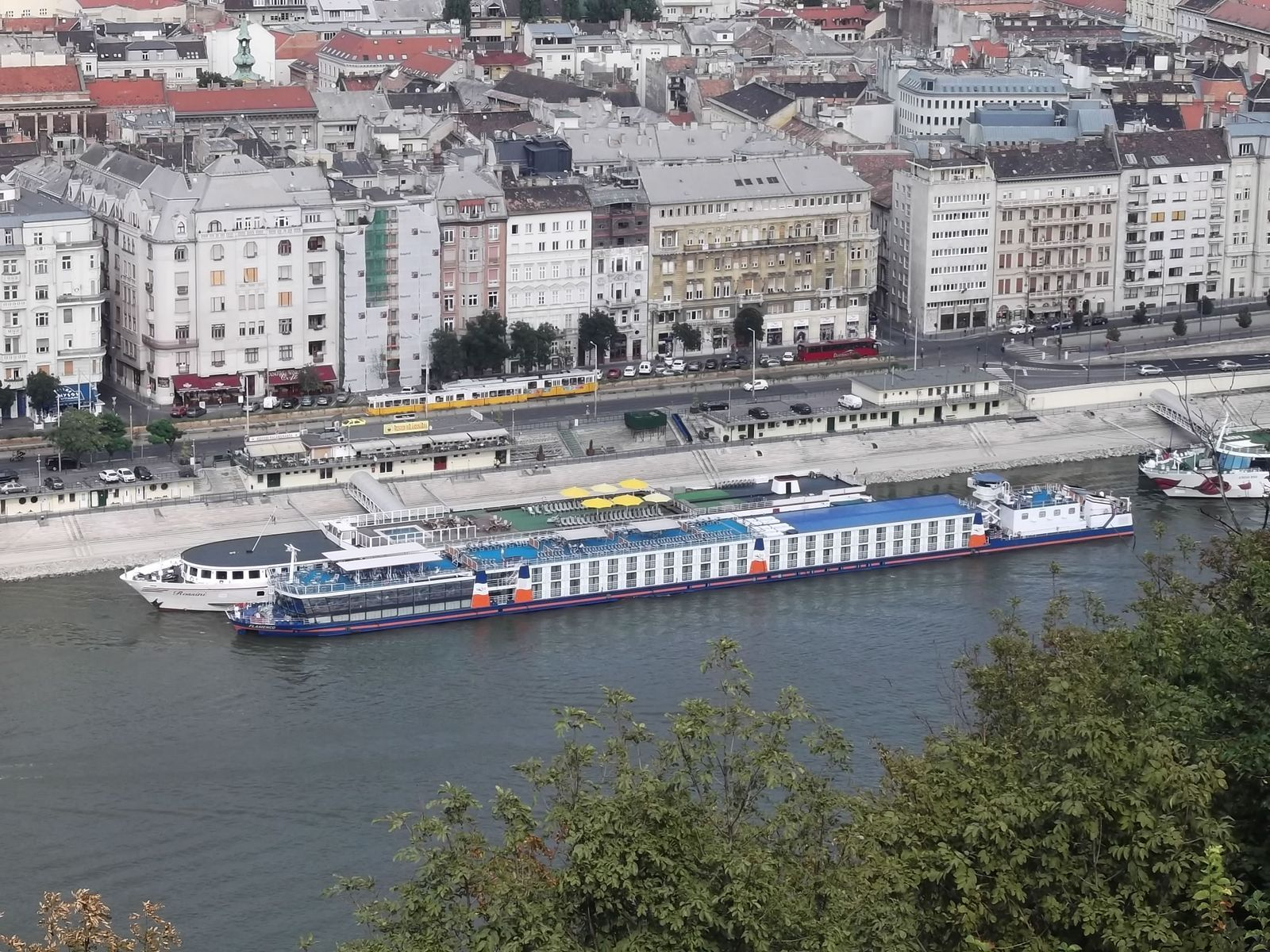
Jane Haining rakpart ("Jane Haining quay"), Budapest

== See also ==
- List of Righteous Among the Nations by country
- Eric Liddell - Scottish Olympic Gold medal winner and Christian missionary who died in a Japanese Prison Camp in China in 1945
- Eva Haller (born Eva Cseko, in 1930)

== Sources ==
=== Works cited ===
News sources and websites are listed in References only.

On Haining

- Czech, Danuta (2000). "A Calendar of the Most Important Events in the History of the Auschwitz Concentration Camp". In Długoborski, Wacław; Piper, Franciszek (eds.). Auschwitz, 1940–1945. Central Issues in the History of the Camp. Volume V: Epilogue. Oświęcim: Auschwitz-Birkenau State Museum. pp. 119–231. ISBN 978-8385047872.
- Gilbert, Martin (1991) [1981]. Auschwitz and the Allies. London: Mandarin Paperbacks. ISBN 978-0749306021.
- Lester, Amy (15 August 2013). "Evolution of the Scottish Mission in Budapest". Reformed Church in Hungary. Archived from the original on 24 April 2018.
- Lee, Frances (28 July 1945). "Letter from Miss Frances W. Lee to Dr. Laszlo Nagy". National Library of Scotland, Acc. 7548, G. 46a, carbon copy.
- McDougall, David (1941). In Search of Israel: A Chronicle of the Jewish Missions of the Church of Scotland. London: Thomas Nelson. OCLC 463073941.
- McDougall, David (1949). Jane Haining of Budapest. Glasgow: Church of Scotland Jewish Mission Committee. OCLC 607693615.
- McDougall, David (1998). Alexander, Ian (ed.). Jane Haining 1897–1944. Edinburgh: The Church of Scotland World Mission. OCLC 64733679.
- "News of Jane Haining". Life and Work. Edinburgh: The Church of Scotland. June 1946. Archived from the original on 19 February 2019.
- Bánóczi, Lídia (producer) (2014). Szeretettel, Jane [With love, Jane] (motion picture). Budapest: IKON Stúdió Egyesület.
- Robertson, Jennifer (Spring 2014). "'An Inspiration to All of Us': Jane Haining of the Scottish Jewish Mission, Budapest" (PDF). Prism. 6: 29–34. ISSN 1949-2707. Archived (PDF) from the original on 19 February 2019.
- Ross, John S. (2011). Time for Favour: Scottish Missions to the Jews 1938–1852. Stoke-on-Trent: Tentmaker Publications. Based on a PhD thesis for the University of Wales, Lampeter, 2004. ISBN 978-1-901670-67-7.
- Stone, Norman (director); Stone, Anna Lisa (producer) (2014). Jane Haining: The Scot Who Died in Auschwitz (television documentary). Glasgow: BBC One Scotland.
- Wright, D. F. (23 September 2004). "Haining, Jane Mathison (1897–1944)". Oxford Dictionary of National Biography (online ed.). Oxford University Press. doi:10.1093/ref:odnb/48816. (Subscription, Wikipedia Library access or UK public library membership required.)

On the Holocaust or Jewish missions

- Braham, Randolph L. (1998) [1994]. "Hungarian Jews". In Gutman, Yisrael; Berenbaum, Michael (eds.). Anatomy of the Auschwitz Death Camp. Bloomington: Indiana University Press. pp. 456–468. ISBN 0-253-32684-2.
- Braham, Randolph L. (2000). The Politics of Genocide: The Holocaust in Hungary. Detroit: Wayne State University Press. ISBN 978-0814326916.
- Braham, Randolph L. (2011). "Hungary: The Controversial Chapter of the Holocaust". In Braham, Randolph L.; Vanden Heuvel, William (eds.). The Auschwitz Reports and the Holocaust in Hungary. New York: Columbia University Press. pp. 29–49. ISBN 978-0880336888.
- Friedländer, Saul (2007). The Years of Extermination: Nazi Germany and the Jews, 1939–1945. New York: HarperCollins. ISBN 978-0-06-019043-9.
- Glaser, Mitchell Leslie (October 1998). A Survey of Missions to the Jews in Continental Europe 1900–1950. Pasadena: Fuller Theological Seminary. Phd thesis.
- Piper, Franciszek (1998) [1994]. "The Number of Victims". In Gutman, Yisrael; Berenbaum, Michael (eds.). Anatomy of the Auschwitz Death Camp. Bloomington: Indiana University Press. pp. 61–76. ISBN 0-253-32684-2.
- Smith, Lyn (2007). Remembering: Voices of the Holocaust. London: Basic Books. ISBN 978-0786719228.
- Walker, Norman L. (1895). Chapters from the History of the Free Church of Scotland. Edinburgh and London: Oliphant Anderson & Ferrier. OCLC 820751140.
- Wyman, David S. (2007) [1984]. The Abandonment of the Jews: America and the Holocaust, 1941–1945. New York: The New Press. ISBN 978-1-59558-174-7.
