= Linda Breder =

Slovak Holocaust survivor

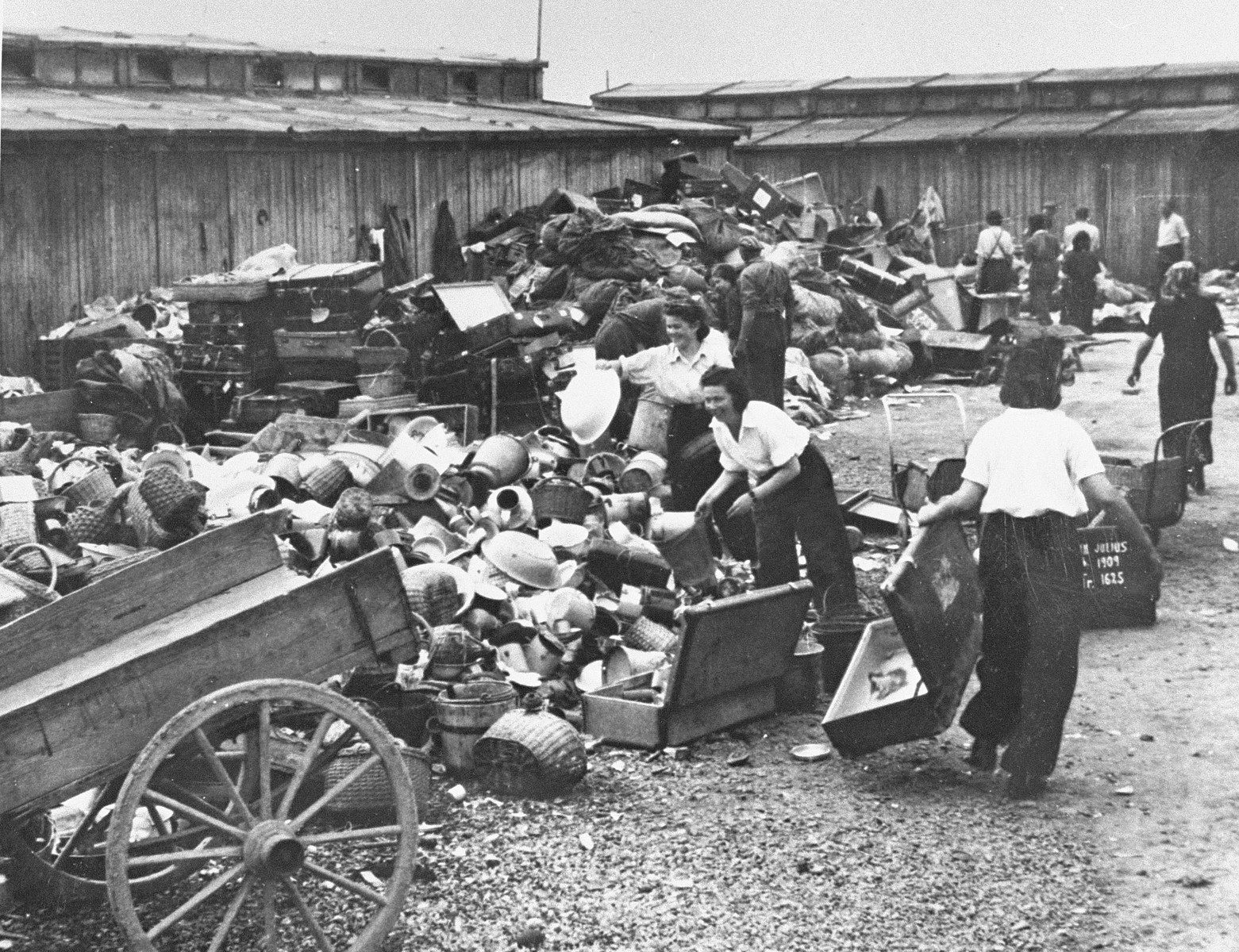
- Breder pictured in one of the pictures of the Auschwitz Album. Breder (pictured second from left wearing white shirt) later said that the photographer ordered prisoners to smile while their pictures were taken.
- Born: Libuša Reich; 24 February 1924; Stropkov, Czechoslovakia
- Died: 19 September 2010 (aged 86); San Francisco, United States
- Citizenship: Slovak-American
- Known for: Holocaust survivor
- Partner: Friedrich Breder

Linda Breder (née Reich; 24 February 1924 – 19 September 2010) was a Slovak Holocaust survivor. During World War II, Breder was among the nearly 1,000 teenage girls and unmarried young women deported on the first official transport of Jews to Auschwitz. Very few of the girls on this first transport – or any of the other early transports – survived the more than three years until the end of the war. In Auschwitz, Breder worked as part of the Kanada Kommando, responsible for collecting the stolen belongings of prisoners, mostly Jews who had been murdered in the gas chambers on arrival.

== Early life ==
Breder grew up in a middle-class Orthodox Jewish home. Her father, a leather merchant and a Hebrew teacher, owned a store in Stropkov and the family lived on the main street of the town. Breder had four siblings: two older brothers, a twin brother, and a younger sister. Following her mother's death during childbirth in 1926, the siblings were raised by their grandparents and maternal aunt, except for Linda and her twin brother, who stayed with their father. Later, after her father remarried, Linda was raised without knowing that her stepmother was not her biological mother.

Before the war, Breder had little experience with antisemitism in her hometown. Breder remembered that before the war, Jews from Poland would stay in her father's house as refugees trying to move further towards south and eventually Palestine. After the occupation of Czechoslovakia began in September 1938 things deteriorated quickly. Slovakia became a client state of Nazi Germany after 14 March 1939. Jewish children were forbidden to attend school, Jewish stores had to be marked with the Star of David and Breder experienced antisemitism in her hometown. The family had to relocate, as Jews were forbidden to live on the main street of Stropkov.

== Auschwitz ==
In 1942, the Slovak Republic initiated the deportation of 58,000 Jews (representing two-thirds of the Slovak Jewish population) to German-occupied Poland, paying Germany 500 Reichsmarks each. At night on 24 March 1942, the Hlinka Guard arrived at Breder's house, informing her that they were gathering young single girls for transportation to Germany to work and support their families left behind. Consequently, Breder was loaded onto a truck with only a few belongings and transported close to the Slovak-Polish border in the city of Poprad, where there was a transit camp.

On March 26, Breder was among the nearly 1,000 teenage girls and unmarried young women deported on the first official transport of Jews to Auschwitz. Prior to this transport, around 1,000 German female criminals had already been sent from Ravensbrück to Auschwitz to serve as kapos. Consequently, upon arrival at Auschwitz, Breder was assigned prisoner number 1173 and marked with a tattoo of this number. Upon arrival, Breder witnessed a murder for the first time when SS guards killed the Jewish doctor who had been assigned to her transport. Alongside the rest of the group, Breder was initially housed in Block 10 at Auschwitz I.

Starting from at least April 1942, Breder and the other women were forced into slave labor. They had to march several kilometers outside the camp with only wooden shoes on their feet. Their first tasks included spreading manure on frozen fields without any tools, using their bare hands. As the weather grew warmer and the fields thawed, the work had to be done barefoot since the wooden shoes would get stuck in the muddy fields, and all tasks had to be performed while running.

=== Kanada Kommando ===
After the first few weeks at the camp, Breder and 300 other young women and girls were transferred to work in what was known as the Kanada Kommando. The task of this working unit was to meticulously sort through all the possessions that the prisoners brought with them to Auschwitz. After the sorting, the belongings were sent to Germany. According to Breder, by the end of August 1942, the women's camp at Auschwitz I was already so overcrowded that some people had to live outside. As a result, Breder's group was marched to the new Birkenau camp (Auschwitz II), located five kilometers away.

Breder considered herself and the other Kanada Kommando prisoners fortunate. They were able to find food among the belongings stolen from the prisoners, which helped them sustain themselves better than other inmates. Additionally, the members of the Kommando had relatively neat clothing, and they were able to offer some assistance to other prisoners in the camp.

== Life after the war ==
Breder lost her entire immediate family in the Holocaust, with the exception of her younger sister Edith Wellisch. Breder returned to Stropkov only to witness that the family home and all its property had been confiscated. In 2000, she recalled the situation of her return to Stropkov in an interview: "They slammed the door in my face. 'Go back where you came from,' they said." After the war, Breder married fellow Slovak survivor Friedrich Breder. They immigrated to San Francisco in the United States in 1966. Linda obtained work in a San Francisco retirement home.

Breder served as a witness in several Nazi war crime trials. She participated, for example, in the trial of Gottfried Weise in the 1980s. Weise worked as a guard in the Kanada warehouses in Auschwitz. Breder remembered Weise because of his cruelty and distinctive glass eye. None of the prisoners knew Weise's name, as he was most often called by his nickname "Ślepy", meaning blind in Slavic languages. Breder was able to identify Weise based on photographs and she testified against him in court. During the trial, Breder described how Weiss wanted to place cans, especially on the heads and shoulders of young boys, to use them as targets for shooting. Breder also recounted how the women working in Kanada attempted to help a thirsty young boy who was on his way to the gas chamber by throwing water to him over the electric fence. When Weiss noticed this, he threw the child into the air and impaled him with his bayonet. When the child didn't die, he struck his head against the wall. Following this, Weise punished the women working in Kanada by lining them up and shooting every tenth woman to death.

In her later years, Breder became an outspoken Holocaust survivor, and shared her experiences through various mediums. In 1997, Breder was the main speaker at the North Peninsula's yearly Yom HaShoah observance. In 2005, her words were quoted by Florida Congresswoman Debbie Wasserman-Schultz in the opening statement delivered on the 60th commemoration of Auschwitz's liberation. Breder was interviewed for the BBC documentary series Auschwitz: The Nazis and 'The Final Solution' that was first televised on BBC Two on 11 January 2005. She returned to Auschwitz several times for educational purposes.
