= Gottfried Weise =

German concentration camp guard

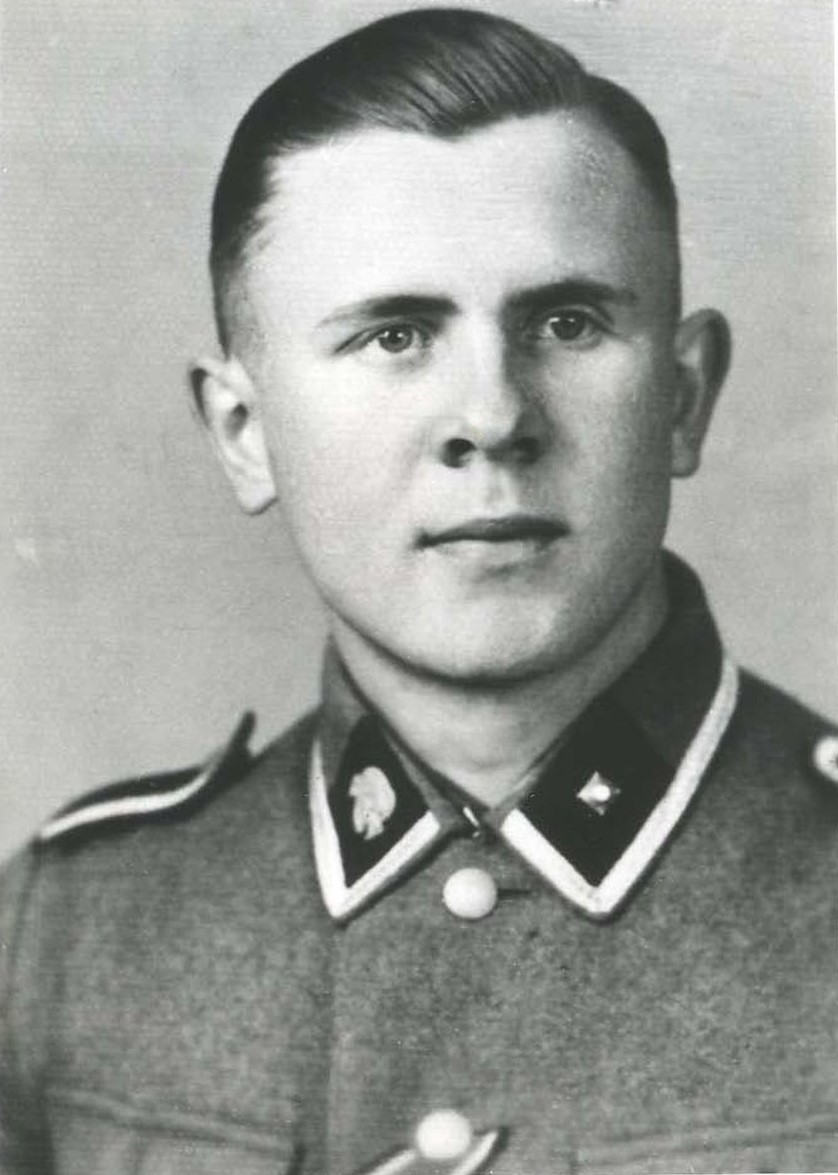
- Gottfried pictured in his SS uniform
- Born: Ewald Franz Gottfried Weise; 11 March 1921; Waldenburg, Saxony, Weimar Republic
- Died: 1 March 2000 (aged 78); Solingen, North Rhine-Westphalia, Germany
- Other names: "Ślepy" (blind) "William Tell of Auschwitz" "The blind one" "Cyclope"
- Organization: Schutzstaffel
- Motive: Nazism; Sadism
- Conviction: War crimes
- Penalty: Life imprisonment, released in 1997 for health reasons
- SS career
- Allegiance: Nazi Germany
- Branch: Waffen-SS
- Service years: 1940–1945
- Rank: Unterscharführer
- Unit: Auschwitz

Ewald Franz Gottfried Weise (11 March 1921 – 1 March 2000) was a German SS-Unterscharführer and guard at the Auschwitz-Birkenau concentration camp. During a relatively short period at Auschwitz – from the end of May 1944 until the end of January 1945 – Weise gained a reputation as an exceptionally cruel guard. According to eyewitnesses, he preferred to use young boys as targets for shooting practice, earning him the nickname "William Tell" among the prisoners. Most inmates referred to him by the nickname "Ślepy" (the Blind), as Weise had a glass eye. After the war, Weise managed to evade punishment due to false testimonies. He was identified again in the 1980s, and a new trial from 1986 to 1988 resulted in a life sentence. However, he was later released on health grounds in 1997.

== Early life ==
Gottfried Weise grew up in middle-class circumstances. His father worked as a builder. After completing elementary school, he began an apprenticeship as a mason in 1935. He successfully completed the apprenticeship after four years in April 1939. Alongside his apprenticeship, he attended trade and public commercial school from 1935 to 1938, followed by a construction school. However, his plans to become a construction technician were cut short when he was called up for military service in September 1940.

== Life during the war ==
In November 1937, at the age of 16, he joined the Hitler Youth as a squadron candidate for the Schutzstaffel (SS). In 1940, he voluntarily enlisted in the Waffen-SS. During the Operation Barbarossa, the invasion of the Soviet Union by Nazi Germany, he suffered severe injuries and lost an eye in September 1941.

=== Auschwitz ===
In May 1944, Gottfried Weise was assigned to the Auschwitz concentration camp as the head of a department. His responsibilities included supervising male and female sorting squads in the Kanada warehouses and managing the administration of prisoner property and personal effects storage. He became notorious among the prisoners for his unpredictable and violent behavior as an SS warden, earning him the nickname "William Tell of Auschwitz."

In June and July 1944, he fatally shot prisoners in the head for failing to report for duty immediately after a short break. He also shot two other prisoners who were hiding in a railway car filled with clothes. Additionally, he targeted a girl, approximately 17 or 18 years old, shooting at tin cans on her head multiple times before delivering a fatal shot to her head. Although other allegations were made against Gottfried Weise, their veracity could not be confirmed with certainty.

In the late summer of 1944, Weiss was stationed in sector B II g of Auschwitz during daylight hours. He was armed with a service pistol, which he carried at his hip. On this particular day, a train transport arrived at Birkenau with deportees. In the sweltering afternoon heat, the people – men, women, and children – were led from the so-called new ramp along a pathway to the west, then north through section B II g towards crematoria IV and V. An unknown boy, approximately 6 to 10 years old, managed to move away from the other deportees. He ran from the main street of the camp to the actual camp area, where he encountered Weiss in the middle of either the southern and central row or the central and northern row of barracks, along the east-west camp road. Witnesses later testified how Weiss had seen and heard the boy crying and pleading for water. Weiss then forced the boy to balance three empty tin cans on his head and shoulders. He gestured and directed the child not to wiggle so much and to stand facing backward. The child stood still in shock and endured the shots without moving. Weiss succeeded in shooting all three cans. He then instructed the boy to cross his arms, clap, and dance with him, to celebrate his successful shooting. Despite an indescribable sense of fear, the child obeyed the commands. Eventually, Weiss lost interest in playing with the boy, who began to cry again. Weiss then pointed his pistol at the child, who stood only a few meters away from him. He aimed and shot the boy in the face, causing the boy to immediately fall to the ground. Weiss approached the boy and stepped on his open palm. Once he was convinced of the child's death, he directed two prisoners to take the body to the crematoria.

Weise departed Auschwitz when the camp was evacuated on 22 January 1945. He was subsequently transported to Berlin before being sent to Ravensbrück concentration camp. In the camp, Weise and two other SS members were assigned to oversee the activities of approximately 25 female inmates in the clothing barracks.

=== Ravensbrück ===
As the Eastern Front approached, it became evident to Weise and other SS members that the war was nearing its end, and the collapse of the Nazi regime was imminent. Consequently, many SS forces stationed at concentration camps underwent a transformation in their treatment of prisoners, prompted by the growing fear of post-war accountability. This change led to a reduction in arbitrary attacks and, in some cases, efforts to demonstrate benevolent behavior towards prisoners, particularly during the final stages of the war.

During this period, it was common for SS members, including Weise, to seek out prisoners who could provide favorable testimony to absolve them of any wrongdoing. Some SS members even believed that by treating surviving prisoners well, they could potentially erase memories of past mistreatment. While Weise associated with such SS groups, he maintained a distance from the prisoners at Ravensbrück. Moreover, he refrained from physically abusing female prisoners under his command. Additionally, Weise occasionally engaged in deceptive conversations with prisoners, falsely portraying that his father was a Jehovah's Witness and claiming that his own involvement in the concentration camp was against his will.

On 28 April 1945, Weise left Ravensbrück with the first column of evacuating prisoners. During their march to Neustadt-Glewe, on 3 May 1945, the column encountered a motorcyclist on the highway near Hagenow, who informed them of ongoing artillery battles involving American forces nearby. Concerned about the approaching American forces and aiming to create the impression of an SS man assisting the prisoners during their final steps to liberation, Weise personally carried a physically disabled female prisoner named Katja across a field to a nearby stream. Soon after, the column encountered American forces, resulting in Weise's capture.

== After the war ==
=== Imprisonment and release ===
Following his capture, Weise remained a prisoner of war in various camps until 26 September 1947, when he was held in Neuengamme concentration camp, which had transitioned into an internment camp. His release was a result of numerous petitions submitted by his father. In addition, Weise's own testimonies did not contain information about his activities during his time in Auschwitz. The limited information he provided was false or misleading. Weise successfully obtained a positive testimonial from a Jehovah's Witness woman who had been imprisoned in Ravensbrück.

After his release, Weise resided with his younger sister's family in Landshut. Soon, he found employment with a construction contractor. From 1948 to 1950 Weise studied and graduated as a civil engineer. He got married on 22 April 1950, and the couple relocated to Solingen. Weise's only son was born on 15 February 1953. During the following years, Weise managed to avoid recognition and found employment as a site manager. After retiring in 1982, Weise continued to work part-time for a construction company. After the war, he didn't receive any criminal convictions.

=== New trial 1986 ===
At some point in the 1980s, Weise was recognized as the cruel guard of Auschwitz. From October 1986 to January 1988, Gottfried Weise faced murder charges in the district court of Wuppertal. On 28 January 1988, he was convicted of five counts of murder and sentenced to life imprisonment.

Linda Breder, a Jewish prisoner working in the Kanada warehouses in Auschwitz, remembered Weise because of his cruelty and distinctive glass eye. None of the prisoners knew his name, as he was most often called by his nickname "Ślepy", meaning blind in Slavic languages. Breder was able to identify Weise based on photographs and she testified against him in court. During the trial, Breder described how Weiss wanted to place cans, especially on the heads and shoulders of young boys, to use them as targets for shooting. Breder also recounted how the women working in Kanada attempted to help a thirsty young boy who was on his way to the gas chamber by throwing water to him over the electric fence. When Weiss noticed this, he threw the child into the air and impaled him with his bayonet. When the child didn't die, he struck his head against the wall. Following this, Weise punished the women working in Kanada by lining them up and shooting every tenth woman to death.

Linda Breder's daughter, Dasha Grafil, described during the trial her confusion at how wealthy and influential Weise appeared to be, despite his horrific actions. During the trial, Weise refused to answer any questions and maintained his complete innocence. Fellow prisoner Kitty Hart-Moxon, who also worked in the Kanada warehouses, has testified similarly to Breder in her interviews after the war.

Several witnesses were heard during the trial, including both former prisoners and SS personnel. It was acknowledged in the trial that evaluating events from 40 years ago posed challenges. Many of the witnesses who had been incarcerated in Auschwitz were reluctant to revisit the events that had left them with lifelong traumas. Their testimonies were considered to carry significant weight in the outcome of the trial, and their accounts were deemed credible. On the other hand, the testimonies of SS personnel were found to be incomplete: the witnesses either refused to speak or were very terse when questioned about the unpleasant aspects of the camp. However, many of them were eager to describe the camp's structures or other matters unrelated to the victims' distressing memories. Inconsistencies were often observed in the testimonies as well. The trial records stated that "the witnesses' conscious or subconscious suppression of memories related to the subject matter was nearly complete and evident."

Weise appealed the verdict and was granted release on bail amounting to 300,000 DM. However, his appeal was subsequently denied by the Düsseldorf Higher Regional Court on 19 April 1989. In an attempt to evade arrest, he fled to Switzerland, assuming the alias "Gerhard Sieber." He spent twelve weeks hiding in a house in Faulensee, located in the canton of Bern. However, he was eventually discovered after suffering a heart attack in a Swiss hospital, leading to his re-arrest. On 4 April 1997, prompted by the then North Rhine-Westphalian Minister of the Interior, Franz-Josef Kniola, he was released from prison for health reasons.
