= Kanada warehouses, Auschwitz =

Stored stolen belongings of prisoners

Kanada, Auschwitz
- Part of the Holocaust
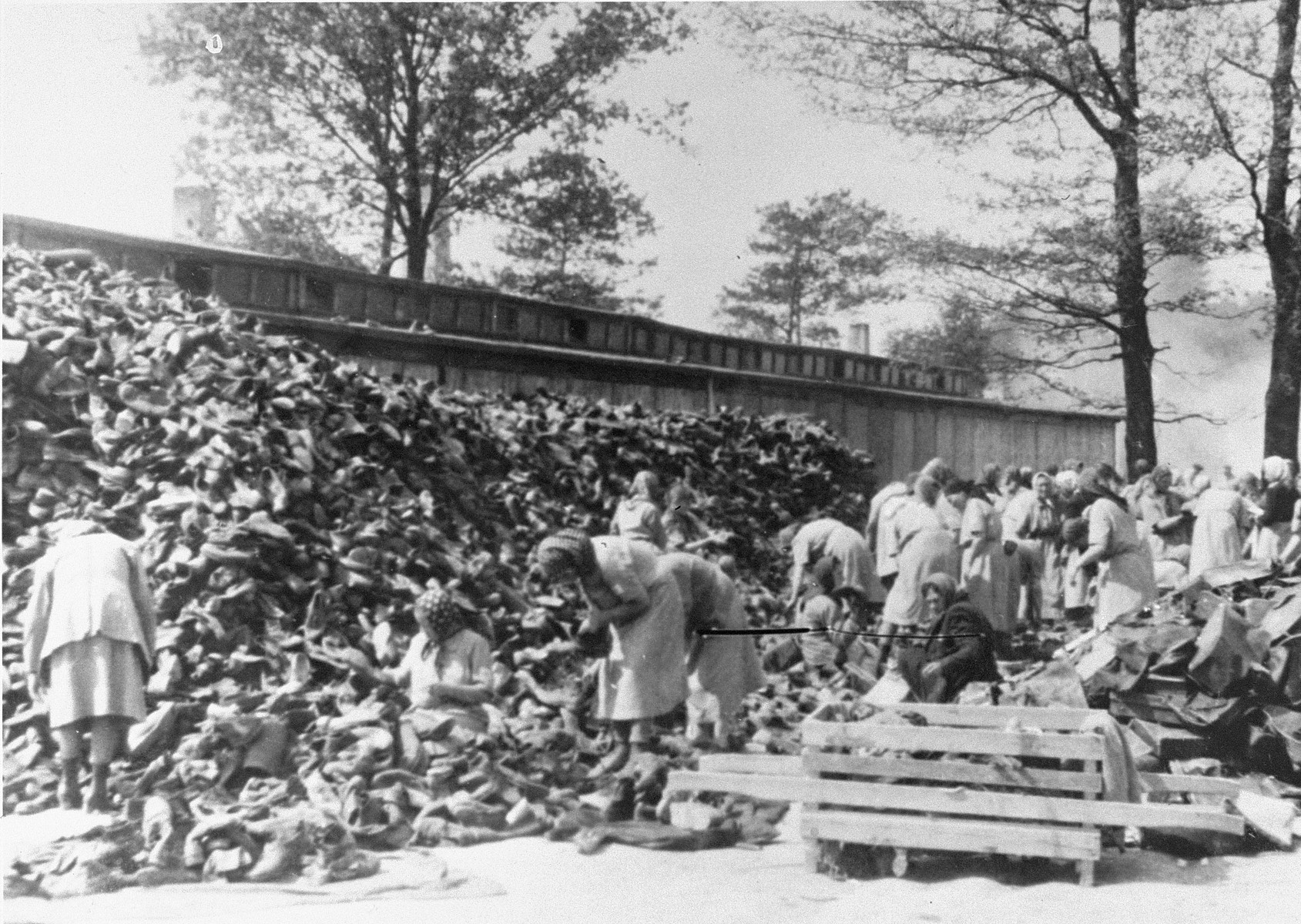
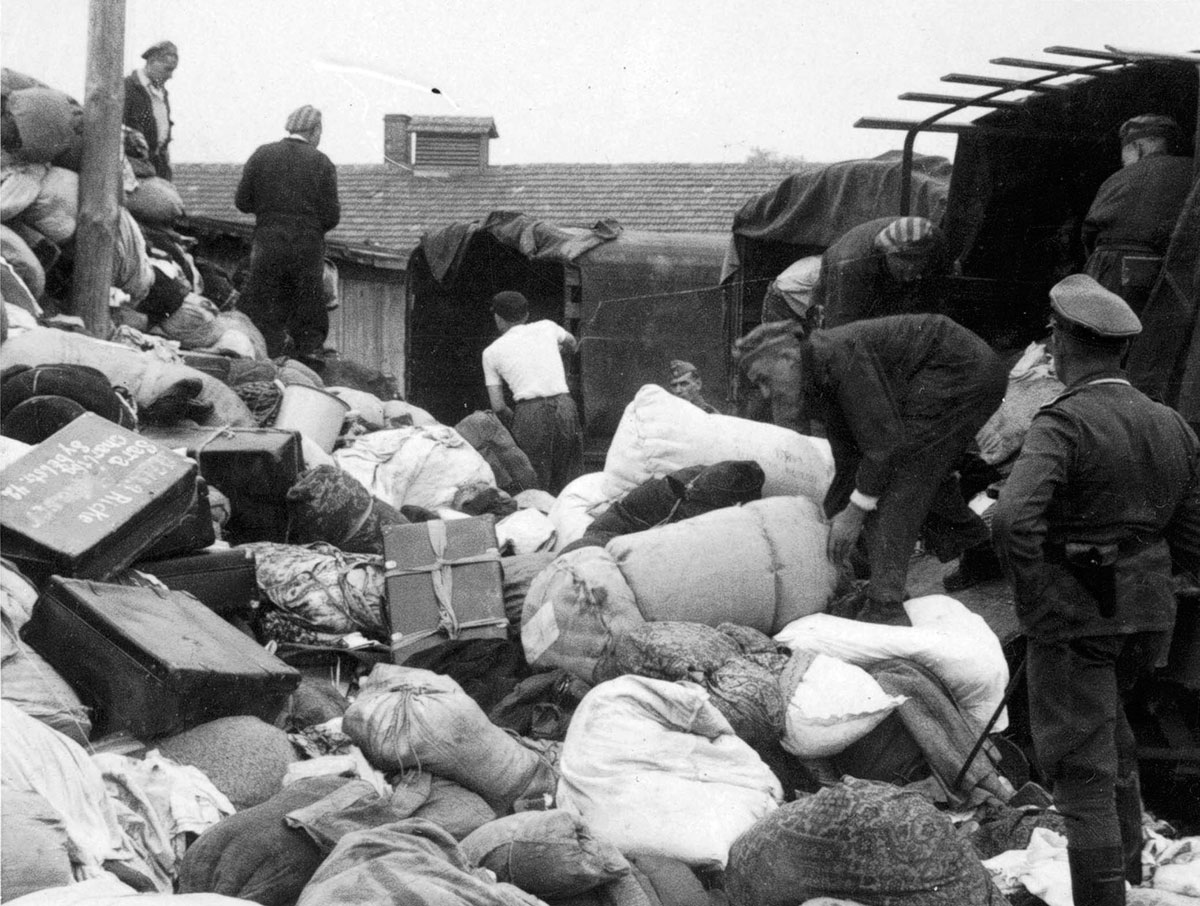
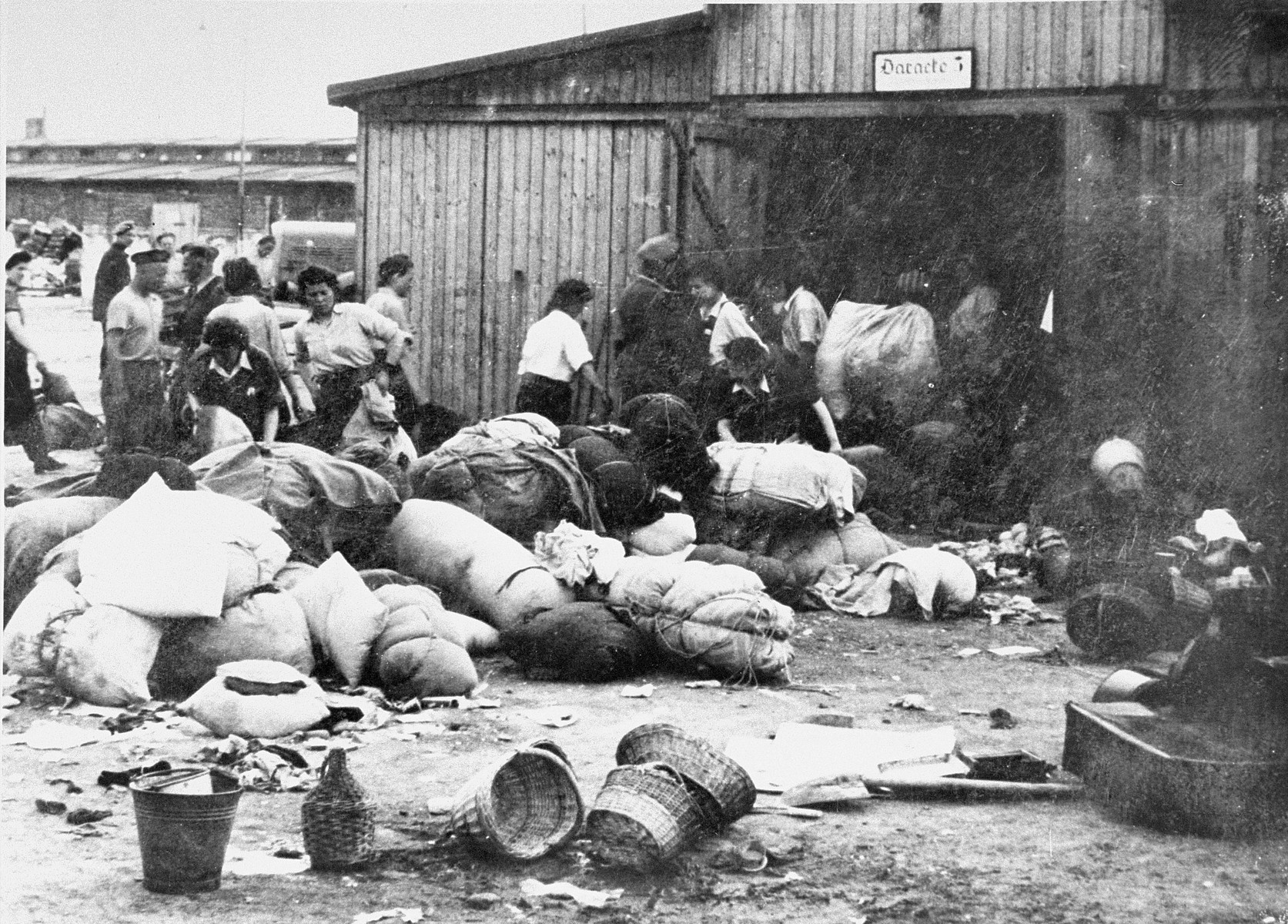
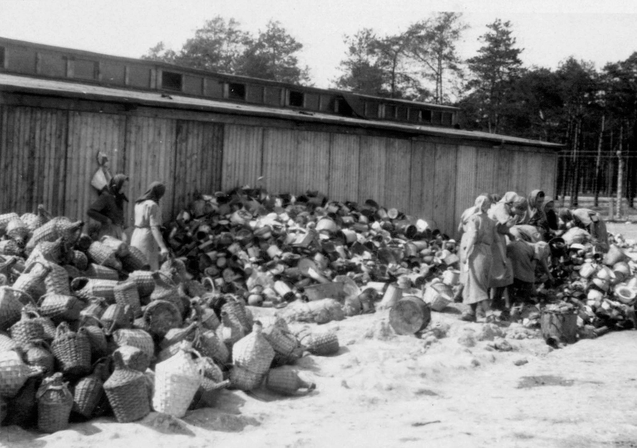
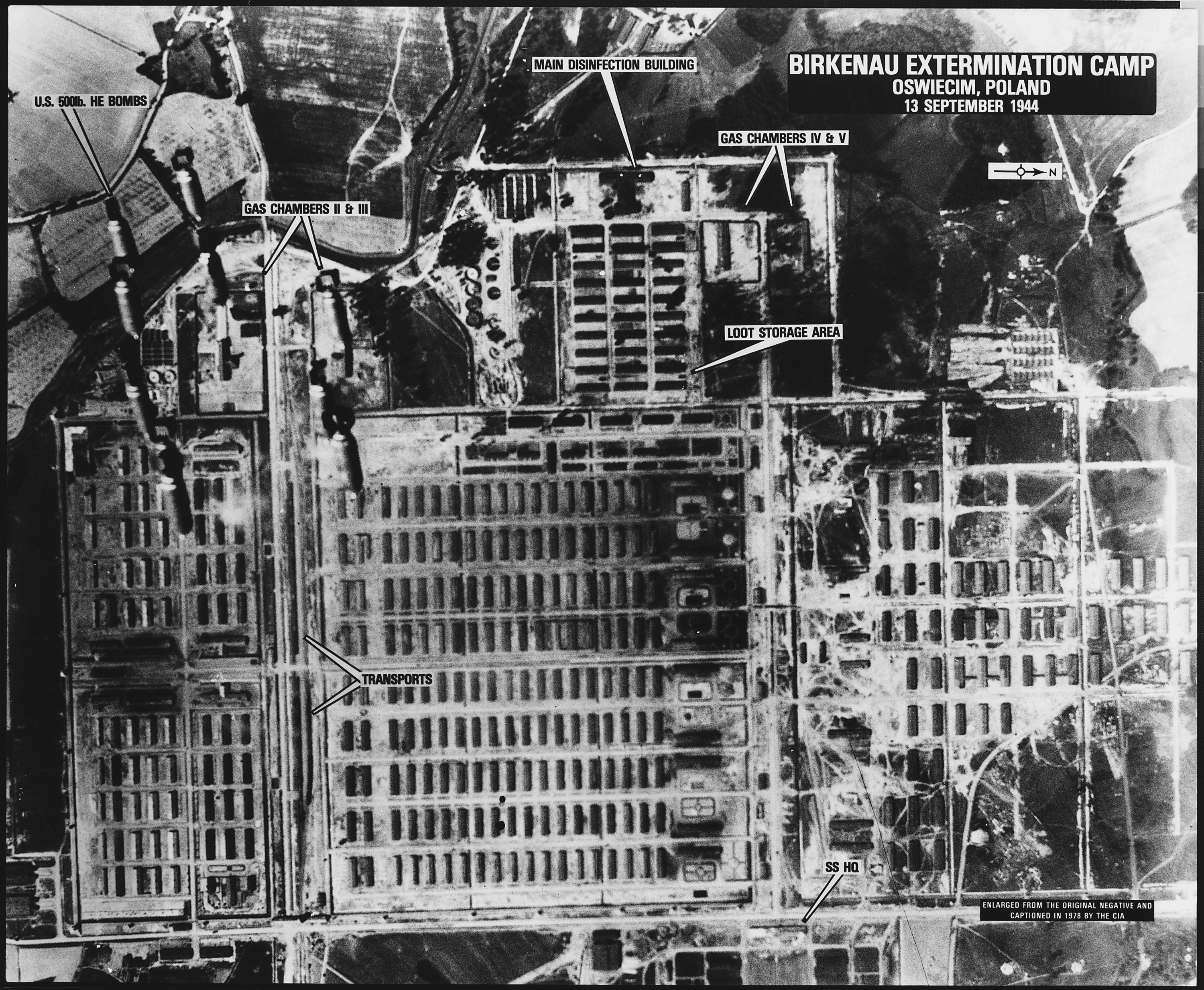
- Above: Auschwitz II, 13 September 1944, during the 15th US Army Air Force bombing of Auschwitz III. The "loot storage area" is Kanada II. Top: Kanada warehouses, c. May 1944.
- Location: Auschwitz concentration camp, occupied Poland
- Description: Warehouses for the looted property of prisoners, Auschwitz I and II

The Kanada warehouses, also known as Effektenlager or simply Kanada, were storage facilities in the Auschwitz concentration camp in German-occupied Poland during the Holocaust. The buildings were used to store the stolen belongings of prisoners, mostly Jews who had been murdered in the gas chambers on arrival. The property of prisoners registered in the camp and used as slave labour was kept on deposit.

The warehouses became known as "Kanada" (or "Canada") because the prisoners saw them as the land of plenty. Although the name began as prisoner slang, it was apparently adopted by some of the camp administration. Prisoners who worked there were known as the Aufräumungskommando ("clearing-up commando") or Kanada Kommando. It was viewed as one of the best jobs in Auschwitz, because prisoners could "organize", in camp slang, and procure goods for themselves and other inmates.

== Victims' belongings ==
From early 1942, when the mass gassing of Jews began, prisoners would bring belongings with them in the belief they were being resettled. The Germans allowed them to carry up to 100 pounds (45 kg). They brought food, alcohol, household items, utensils, clothing, prams, medication, valuables, and professional tools, with their names, addresses and dates of birth on the luggage, all of which ended up in Kanada.

When they arrived at the camp, prisoners had to strip naked, either to be shaved and given camp clothes or to be gassed. From around 1942, the belongings of murdered Jews, Poles, French citizens, the Roma and Soviet citizens and POWs were regarded as the property of Germany, which meant the camp made no attempt to pass it to the next of kin. The goods were sorted and packaged by the Kanada Kommando, appointed from among registered prisoners who had been admitted to the camp as workers. The goods were then used in the camp itself or sent elsewhere, including to Germany.

The first warehouses, Kanada I, were originally in block 26 of Auschwitz I, the main camp in the complex, but were expanded in December 1943 to Kanada II, 30 wooden buildings near the gas chambers in the BIIg section of Auschwitz II-Birkenau, the extermination camp. There were also two barracks for the Kanada Kommando and one for the SS who worked there. At the beginning of 1944 two Italian young women also worked in Kanada. They arrived with a transport from north Italy. On 22 July 1944, 210 male prisoners worked in Kanada I and 590 in Kanada II; on 2 October that year, 250 female prisoners worked in Kanada I and 815 in Kanada II. Later 1,500–2,000 worked in Kanada II.

== Liberation ==
On 23 January 1945, during the evacuation of the camp as the Red Army approached, the SS set Kanada II on fire, along with the crematoria and gas chambers. Apparently, the warehouses burned for five days, destroying everything except for spoons and other utensils, although items belonging to victims were found in other warehouses in Auschwitz I.

== See also ==
- Auschwitz Album

== Bibliography ==
- Greif, Gideon (2005). We Wept Without Tears: Testimonies of the Jewish Sonderkommando from Auschwitz. New Haven and London: Yale University Press. ISBN 978-0-300-10651-0.
- Ministerio della Pubblica Istruzione (2006–2007). La lezione della Shoah. Questione etica, riflessione storica e culturale, sfida della memoria [The lesson of the Shoah. Ethical question, historical and cultural reflection, challenge of memory] (in Italian). Firenze: Le Monnier. pp. 118–120.
- Piper, Franciszek (2009). "Auschwitz II-Birkenau Main Camp". In Megargee, Geoffrey P. (ed.). Encyclopedia of Camps and Ghettos, 1933–1945. Vol. 1A. Bloomington and Indianapolis: Indiana University Press in association with the United States Holocaust Memorial Museum. pp. 209–214. ISBN 978-0-253-35328-3.
- Strzelecka, Irena; Setkiewicz, Piotr (2000). "The Construction, Expansion and Development of the Camp and its Branches". In Długoborski, Wacław; Piper, Franciszek (eds.). Auschwitz, 1940–1945. Central Issues in the History of the Camp. Vol. I: The Establishment and Organization of the Camp. Oświęcim: Auschwitz-Birkenau State Museum. pp. 63–138. ISBN 978-838504787-2. OCLC 874340863.
- Strzelecki, Andrzej (1998). "The Plunder of Victims and Their Corpses". In Berenbaum, Michael; Gutman, Yisrael (eds.). Anatomy of the Auschwitz Death Camp. Bloomington: Indiana University Press. pp. 246–266. ISBN 0-253-20884-X – via Internet Archive.
- Strzelecki, Andrzej (2000). "The Liquidation of the Camp". In Długoborski, Wacław; Piper, Franciszek (eds.). Auschwitz, 1940–1945. Central Issues in the History of the Camp. Vol. V: Epilogue. Oświęcim: Auschwitz-Birkenau State Museum. pp. 9–85. ISBN 978-838504787-2. OCLC 929235229.
- Tiburzi, Antonella (2006). Non perdonerò mai. Portogruaro: Nuova dimensione. ISBN 978-888910032-5.
