= Irena Strzelecka =

Irena Strzelecka (4 January 1940 – 31 May 2017) was a Polish historian and senior custodian of the Auschwitz-Birkenau State Museum in Poland. She was awarded the Knight's Cross of the Order of Polonia Restituta for her work on the history of the Auschwitz concentration camp.

The author of over 30 articles on the camp, Strzelecka wrote about its hospitals, its medical experiments, and the situation of its female prisoners. She was the author of several articles in the five-volume monograph Auschwitz 1940–1945 (2000), including on the camp's construction and the punishment of prisoners; she also helped to retrieve and document the history of several of the Auschwitz subcamps. With Franciszek Piper, she edited a series on Polish political prisoners sent to Auschwitz from Kraków, Lublin, Radom and Warsaw.

Strzelecka was born in Przemyśl. A graduate of the history and philosophy department at Jagiellonian University, she joined the Department of Historical Research of the Auschwitz-Birkenau State Museum in 1965.

== Selected works ==
- (2008). Medical Crimes: The Experiments in Auschwitz. Oświęcim: Auschwitz-Birkenau State Museum. ISBN 978-8360210796 OCLC 908696508
- (2009). Medical Crimes: The Hospitals in Auschwitz. Oświęcim: Auschwitz-Birkenau State Museum. ISBN 978-8360210703 OCLC 939016404
- (2010). Punishment in Auschwitz. Oświęcim: Auschwitz-Birkenau State Museum. ISBN 978-8360210949 OCLC 908768155
- (2016). Women in Auschwitz. Oświęcim: Auschwitz-Birkenau State Museum. ISBN 978-8377041918 OCLC 1010872112

== See also ==
- List of recipients of the Order of Polonia Restituta
