= Saint Stephen's Theatre, Edinburgh =

Former church in Edinburgh, Scotland

Coordinates: 55.9586°N 3.2035°W

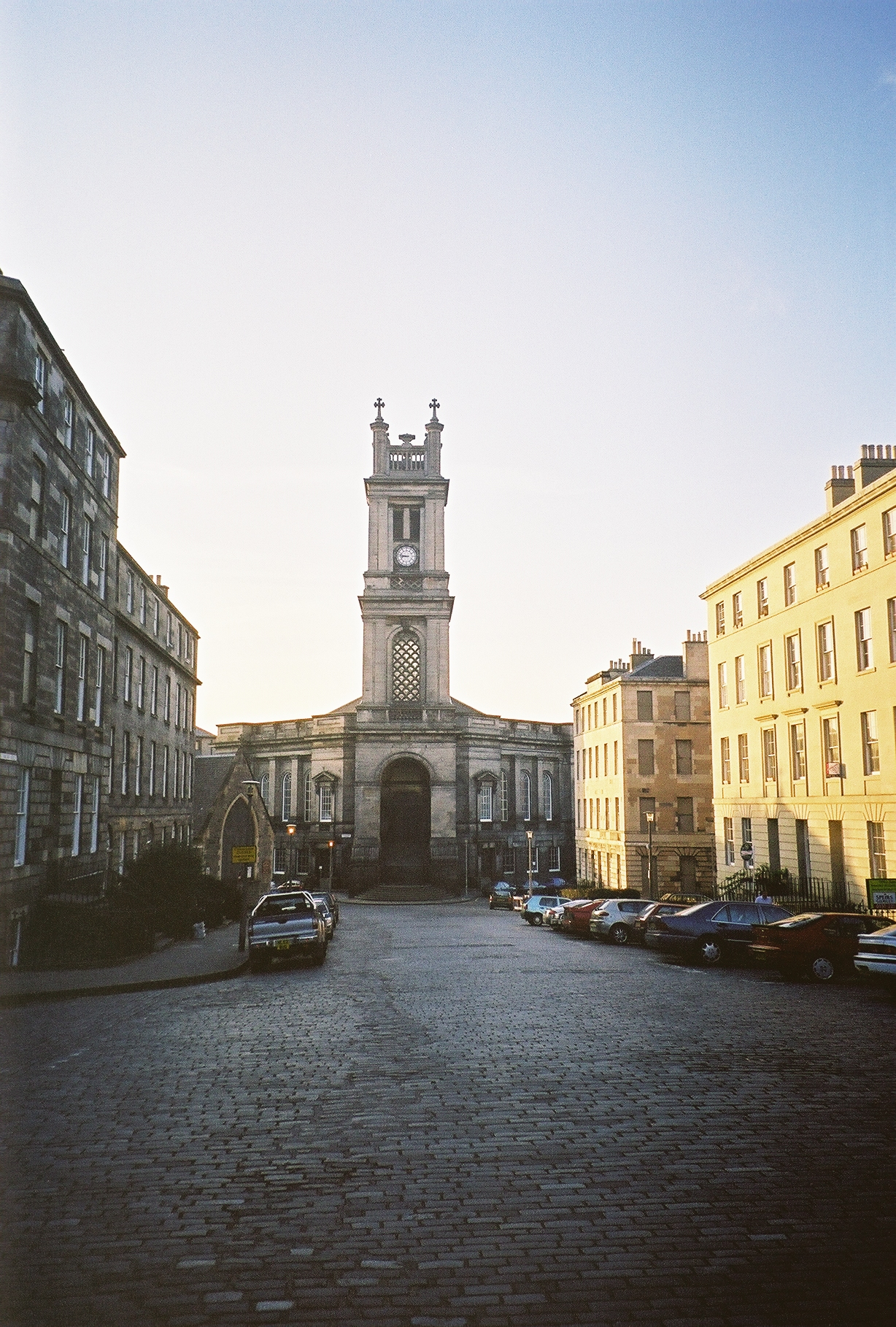
St Stephen's, Edinburgh, viewed from St Vincent Street

Saint Stephen's Theatre is a former Church of Scotland church located in the Northern New Town of Edinburgh, Scotland, at the corner of Saint Stephen Street and Saint Vincent Street, now a theatre and event venue.

== Use as a church ==
St Stephen's Church was built in 1827–1828, on a vast scale, to a design by architect William Henry Playfair (1789–1857). It is described as "Baroque power and Grecian severity ..., dominating the long vista from the lower end [of St Vincent Street] and ingeniously conforming to the oblique line of St Stephen Street." The church had an unusual plan, square with cut-off north and south corners, located diagonally.

The first minister of the church was William Muir, who opened an evening school in the large vaulted cellars of the church for the education of the illiterate.

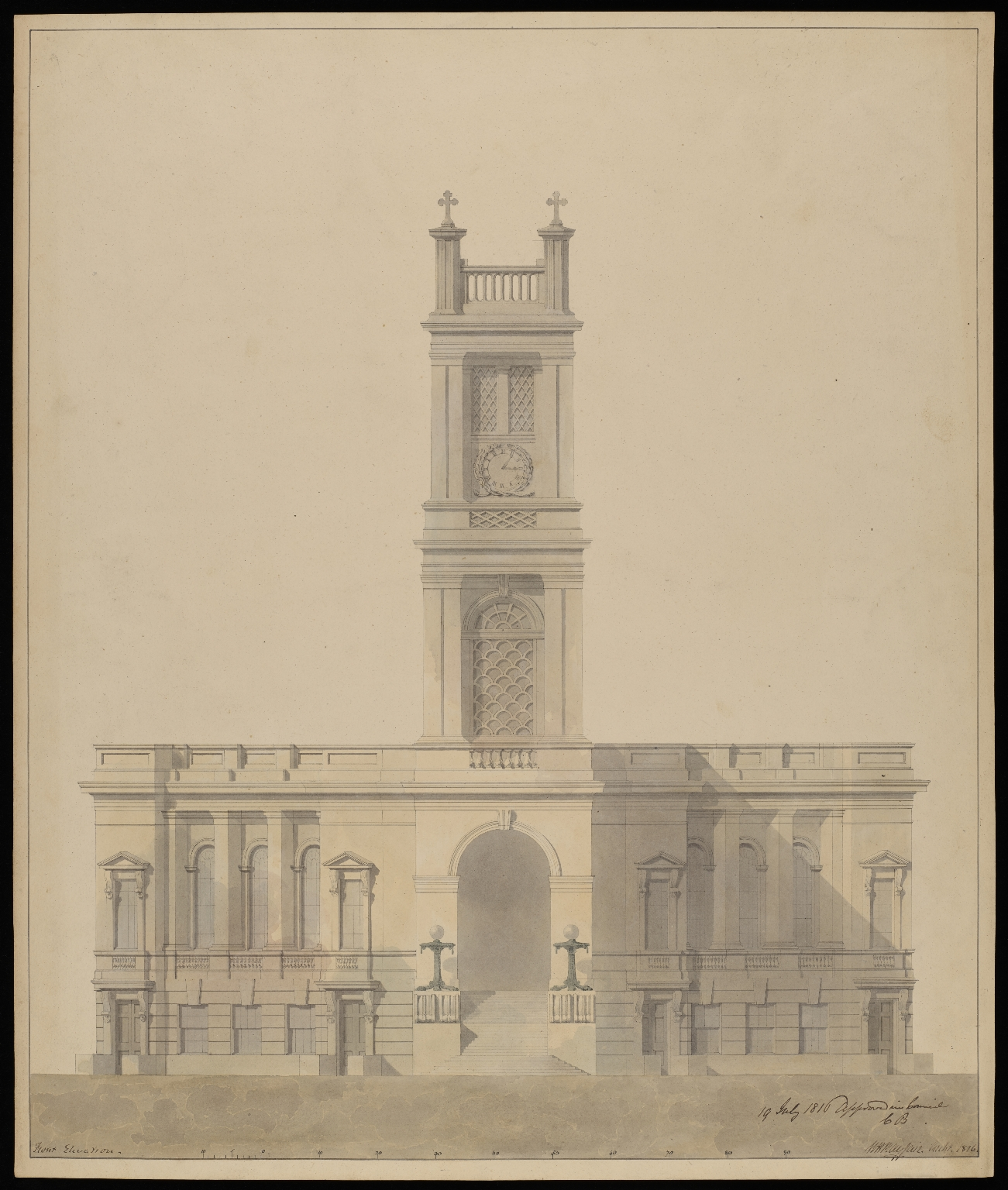
Architectural Drawing of St Stephen's Church by William Henry Playfair

The interior was altered in 1956, the congregation having declined. A major fundraising effort was organised led by the then minister, the Revd A. Ian Dunlop. This was one of the first subdivisions of major buildings in Edinburgh, with the reconstructed church occupying effectively the gallery level accessed by the main staircase from St Vincent Street, and a number of halls (including a main hall with fully fitted stage etc.) and meeting rooms formed below. These halls have over the years hosted a number of events including Festival Fringe shows. During the reconstruction the church fittings by architect David Rhind (1808–1883) were kept, as was the organ by Willis, which was re-built on the "gallery" level.

== Later uses ==
On 27 June 2014, Leslie Benzies, a video game producer and at the time president of Rockstar North, announced a deal to purchase the church for over £500,000. He planned to preserve the building and create a trust composed of members of the community to manage it. However, in 2017, Philip Johnston, trustee for the Benzies Foundation announced, "We now believe we have taken this as far as we can".

On 12 July 2017, Peter Schaufuss, ballet dancer and founder of the English National Ballet School, purchased the church from the Benzies Foundation, stating "I plan to make the Great Hall a world-class theatre, one that will attract productions from leading companies from around the world". Ground and basement areas would be intended to find mixed commercial, cultural and community usage. St Stephen's has since his takeover gone through much refurbishment. The main hall, now named Ashton Hall, is one of the largest performing spaces in Scotland. The building is the home of newly founded Edinburgh Festival Ballet and its School and Scottish theatre school MGA Academy, as well as other cultural activities. It plays an important role in the community as well as its role as a venue at the annual Edinburgh Festival.

== Clock ==
The 162 feet (49 m)-high tower has the longest clock pendulum in Europe at 60 feet (18 m) with a period of 8.6 seconds. The clock was installed in 1828 by James Ritchie & Son.

== Performing space ==
St Stephen's has hosted a number of shows at the Edinburgh Festival Fringe over the years. From 2001 to 2007 it hosted Wolfgang Hoffman's Aurora Nova venue, with a number of dance shows. Aurora Nova withdrew from the Fringe in 2008, citing costs and loss of sponsorship, and the space was not used in 2008. The space was revived in 2009, with The Arches at St Stephen's being planned for the 2009 festival.

Prior to this, it also hosted the Scottish Community Drama Association's 1963 Festival.

In 2014, the building was for sale, with considerable speculation that it could be converted it into an arts centre with spaces for live music, dance and theatre.

== Stolperstein ==
A brass Stolperstein has been placed outside St Stephen's Church, Stockbridge, in memory of Jane Haining (1897–1944), unveiled in November 2025 in a ceremony attended by members of her family. The church had held a service for her in 1932 before she left for her work as a matron in Budapest.
