= Danuta Czech =

Polish historian

- Born: 1922
- Died: 2004 (aged 81–82)

Academic work
- Discipline: Holocaust studies

Danuta Czech (1922 – 4 April 2004) was a Polish Holocaust historian and deputy director of the Auschwitz-Birkenau State Museum in Oświęcim, Poland. She is known for her book The Auschwitz Chronicle: 1939–1945 (1990).

== Background ==
Czech was born in Humniska, Poland. During World War II and the German occupation of Poland, her father, Stefan Czech, was a member of the Home Army who spent time in the Auschwitz, Buchenwald and Dora-Mittelbau concentration camps. Czech attended the St. Kinga gymnasium in Tarnów, graduating in 1939, then the commercial lyceum, also in Tarnów, in 1941. According to the museum, she became a member of the Polish resistance, along with her father. From 1946 to 1952, she studied sociology at Jagiellonian University, Kraków, obtaining a master of philosophy degree. In 1955 she began work as a researcher with the Auschwitz-Birkenau State Museum, eventually becoming its deputy director.

== The Auschwitz Chronicle ==
Almost 1,000 pages in length, The Auschwitz Chronicle is a meticulous chronicle of events in the Auschwitz concentration camp from construction to liberation. According to the Auschwitz museum, the book became Czech's life's work: "No serious scholarly work on Auschwitz could fail to cite her study."

== Selected works ==
- (1984) with Jadwiga Bezwinska (eds.). KL Auschwitz Seen by the SS: Höss, Broad, Kremer. New York: Howard Fertig.
- (1990). The Auschwitz Chronicle: 1939–1945. New York: Holt. First published in installments by the Auschwitz-Birkenau State Museum in 1958–1963. Also published as Kalendarium wydarzen w obozie Koncentracyjnm Auschwitz-Birkenau 1939–1945.
- (1996) with Franciszek Piper and Teresa Świebocka. Auschwitz: Nazi death camp. Oświęcim: Auschwitz-Birkenau State Museum.
- (2000). "A Calendar of the Most Important Events in the History of the Auschwitz Concentration Camp". In Długoborski, Wacław; Piper, Franciszek (eds.). Auschwitz, 1940–1945. Central Issues in the History of the Camp. Volume V: Epilogue. Oświęcim: Auschwitz-Birkenau State Museum. pp. 119–231.
