= Aleksander Lasik =

Polish historian

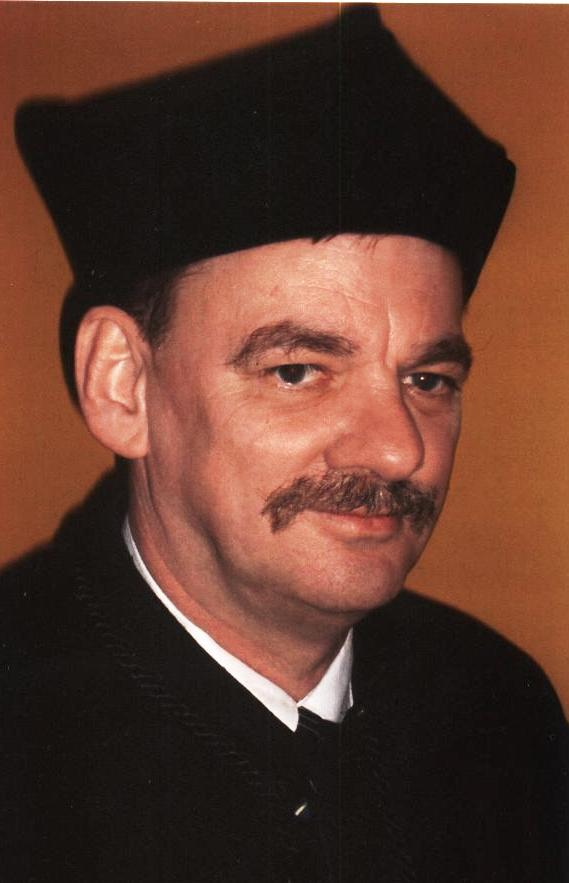
Aleksander Lasik

Aleksander Lasik (born 1953) is a Polish historian specializing in the history of the Schutzstaffel (SS) within German concentration camps. A professor at the Kazimierz Wielki University in Bydgoszcz, he has worked as an historian for Poland's Institute of National Remembrance.

Lasik is known, in particular, for having helped to compile a database, which he started in 1982 when he was writing his PhD, of 25,000 names of those who staffed concentration camps in German-occupied Poland during the Holocaust. The list includes 9,686 names of personnel at the Auschwitz concentration camp. The Institute of National Remembrance added the database to its website in 2017.

Lasik obtained his PhD in 1988 from Adam Mickiewicz University in Poznań. He was one of the historical consultants for the BBC series Auschwitz: The Nazis and "The Final Solution" (2005).

== Selected works ==
- Załoga SS w KL Auschwitz w latach 1940–1945. Bydgoszcz: Wydawn. Uczelniane Wyższej Szkoly Pedagogicznej w Bydgoszczy, 1994. ISBN 978-8370960926
- "Historical-Sociological Profile of the Auschwitz SS ". Gutman, Yisrael; Berenbaum, Michael, eds. (1998). Anatomy of the Auschwitz Death Camp. Bloomington: Indiana University Press. pp. 271–287. ISBN 0-253-32684-2.
- "Rudolf Höss: Manager of Crime". Gutman, Yisrael; Berenbaum, Michael, eds. (1998). Anatomy of the Auschwitz Death Camp. Bloomington: Indiana University Press. pp. 288–300. ISBN 0-253-32684-2.
- "Organizational Structure of Auschwitz Concentration Camp". Długoborski, Wacław; Piper, Franciszek, eds. (2000). Auschwitz, 1940–1945. Central Issues in the History of the Camp. Volume I: The Establishment and Organization of the Camp. Oświęcim: Auschwitz-Birkenau State Museum. pp. 145–279.
- "The Apprehension and Punishment of the Auschwitz Concentration Camp Staff". Długoborski, Wacław; Piper, Franciszek, eds. (2000). Auschwitz, 1940–1945. Central Issues in the History of the Camp. Volume V: Epilogue. Oświęcim: Auschwitz-Birkenau State Museum. pp. 99–117.
- Sztafety Ochronne w systemie niemieckich obozów koncentracyjnych. Oświęcim: Auschwitz-Birkenau Museum, 2007. ISBN 9788360210321
- "The matter of citizenship among SS-personnel at KL Auschwitz in the years 1940–1945". Auschwitz Studies, 26, 2012, pp. 49–125.
