= Piotr Setkiewicz =

Piotr Setkiewicz (born 1963) is the director of Centre for Research at the Auschwitz-Birkenau State Museum (Centrum Badań Państwowego Muzeum Auschwitz-Birkenau w Oświęcimiu); a graduate of the Faculty of History at the Jagiellonian University in Kraków. Setkiewicz received his Ph.D. degree in 1999 at the University of Silesia in Katowice for the work entitled IG Farben - Werk Auschwitz 1941-1945. He is the editor-in-chief of scientific publication The Auschwitz Journals (Zeszyty Oświęcimskie) as the head historian at the Auschwitz Museum.

Auschwitz Museum
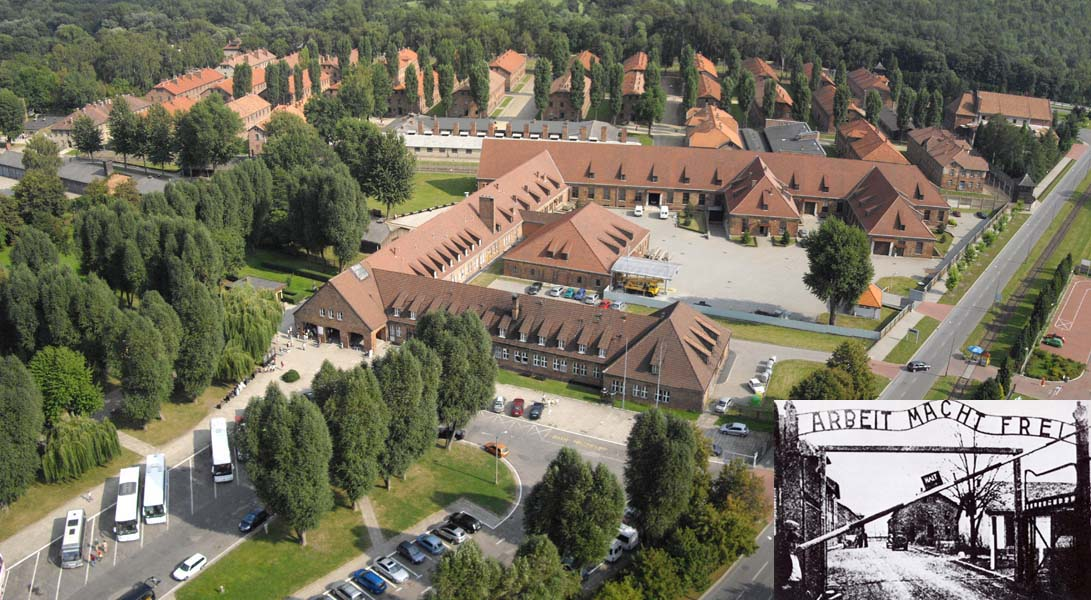
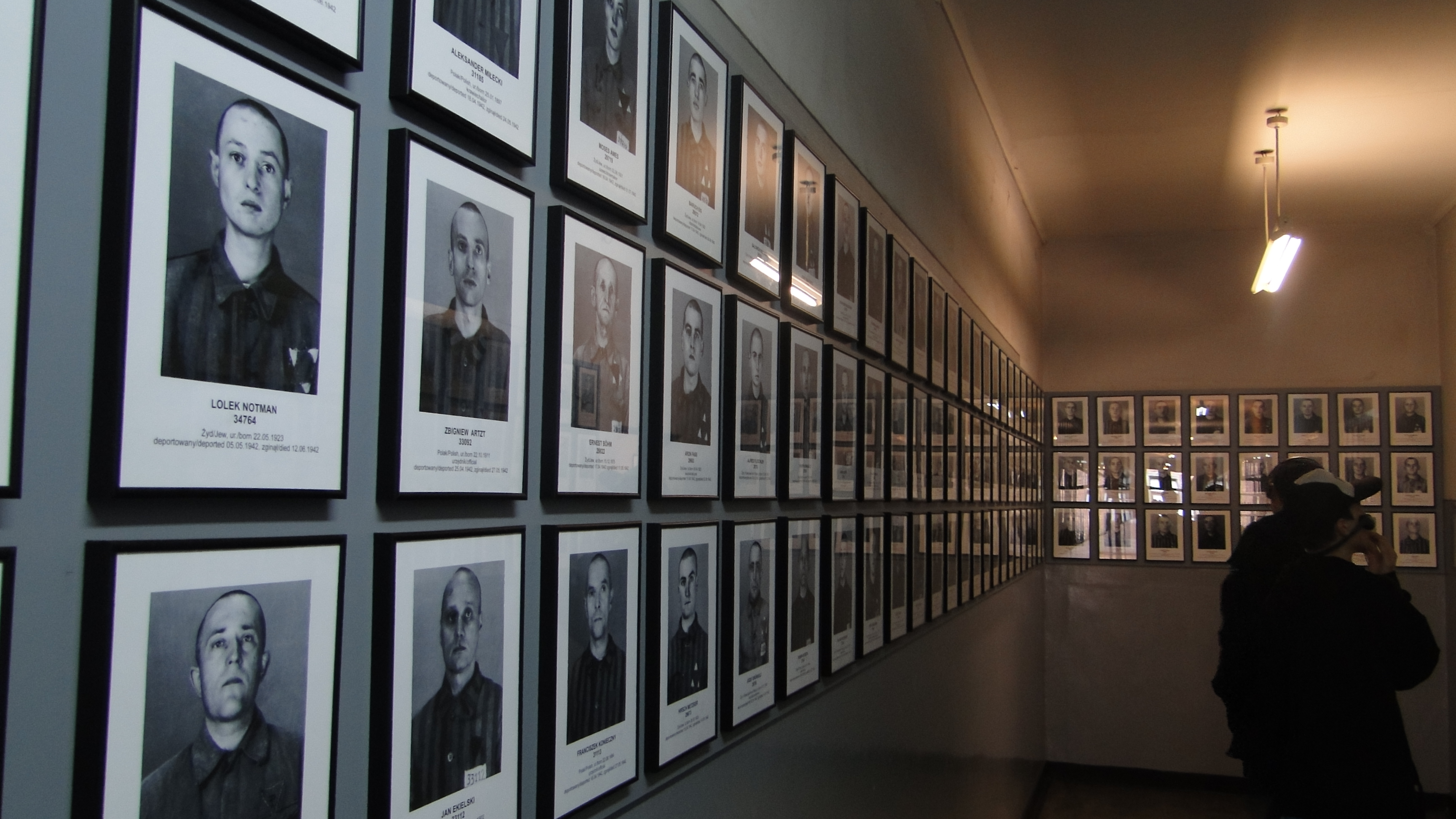

Setkiewicz became research scientist at the Auschwitz Museum in 1988 upon graduation from University. He worked at the Science Department (Dział Naukowy), than in 2001–2007 was appointed Director of Archives and in 2008 Director of the Science Department since renamed as the Centre for Research (Centrum Badań) in 2014. Setkiewicz's own scientific work is focused on the history of prisoner labour in the Nazi German war industries during World War II and the subcamps of Auschwitz concentration camp. He is the author of numerous publications on the subject.

== Selected publications ==
- Z dziejów obozów IG Farben Werk Auschwitz 1941-1945, Oświęcim 2006. ISBN 83-60210-19-5.
- Krematoria i komory gazowe Auschwitz, Głosy Pamięci t. 6: Oświęcim 2010. ISBN 978-83-7704-017-1.
- Życie prywatne esesmanów w Auschwitz, Oświęcim 2012. ISBN 978-83-7704-051-5 .
- Auschwitz od A do Z. Ilustrowana historia obozu, Państwowe Muzeum Auschwitz-Birkenau, Oświęcim 2013, ISBN 978-83-7704-060-7.

== Medals and awards ==
- Cross of Merit (Poland) (2004)
- Medal for Merit to Culture – Gloria Artis (2007)
