= Franciszek Piper =

Polish scholar, historian and author (born 1941)

- Born: 1941 (age 84–85); Warsaw, Poland
- Occupations: Author, scholar, historian

Franciszek Piper (born 1941) is a Polish scholar, historian and author. Most of his work concerns the Holocaust, especially the history of the Auschwitz concentration camp. Dr. Piper is credited as one of the historians who helped establish a more accurate number of victims of Auschwitz-Birkenau death camps. According to his research, at least 1.1 million people were murdered at Auschwitz-Birkenau, of whom about 960,000 were Jewish. He is the author of several books and chair of the Historical Department at the Auschwitz-Birkenau State Museum.

== Auschwitz: How Many Perished ==
Franciszek Piper, former Head of Historical department of the Auschwitz Museum, is the author of scholarly analysis translated numerous times and widely quoted by foremost Holocaust historians and the media, in which he presented the results of his scientific analysis of the original sources and findings on the deportations to Auschwitz. Piper concluded that a total of at least 1,300,000 people were deported there, and that 1,100,000 of them were murdered at the camp. Approximately 200,000 prisoners were deported from Auschwitz to other camps as part of the redistribution of labour as well as final liquidation of the camp. About 81 percent of Jews transported to Auschwitz by the Holocaust trains, or 890,000 men, women, and children, were murdered immediately upon arrival and were not registered. The postwar testimony of camp's commandant, Rudolf Höss, presented at the Nuremberg trials of 1946, was therefore also proven to be unreliable and grossly exaggerated for reasons unknown. The book by Franciszek Piper was published in English as Auschwitz: How Many Perished Jews, Poles, Gypsies, consecutively in 1991, 1992 and 1994.

== Written works ==
- Auschwitz Prisoner Labor, Auschwitz-Birkenau State Museum, 2002, ISBN 8388526243
- Poles in Auschwitz, Auschwitz-Birkenau State Museum, 2013, Voices of Memory Series: 8, ISBN 9788377040591
- I Am Healthy and I Feel Fine: The Auschwitz Letters of Marian Henryk Serejski, 2010
- Auschwitz: How Many Perished Jews, Poles, Gypsies, Krakow: Poligrafia ITS, 1992, OCLC 30831088 (Yad Vashem Studies Vol. XXI Jerusalem, 1991 excerpts)
- Auschwitz: Nazi Death Camp, Auschwitz-Birkenau State Museum; 1st edition 1996, 2nd edition 2002, ISBN 8385047565
- Żydzi w KL Auschwitz, Państwowe Muzeum Auschwitz-Birkenau, 2015, Głosy Pamięci Series: 9, ISBN 9788377040812
- Ilu ludzi zginęło w KL Auschwitz, Wydawn. Państwowego Muzeum w Oświęcimiu, 1992, ISBN 8385047018
- Zeszyty Oświęcimskie nr 21, ISSN 0474-8581
- Zeszyty Oświęcimskie nr 25, ISSN 0474-8581
